American singer-songwriter Madonna (b. 1958) has had a social-cultural impact on the world through her recordings, attitude, clothing and lifestyle since her early career in the 1980s. Madonna has built a legacy that goes beyond music and has been studied by sociologists, historians and other social scientists. This contributed to the rise of the Madonna studies, an academic and critical response dedicated to her work and persona for which Madonna's semiotic and image was diversified in a wide-ranging of theoretical stripe from feminism to queer studies among others.

Called a "major 'historical figure'" by academic Camille Paglia, Madonna attained the status of a "cultural icon" as was noted by cultural theorists or sociologists like Stuart Sim and Suzanna Danuta Walters. Frenchman scholar Georges-Claude Guilbert attributed her a greater cultural significance and proposed the singer as a postmodern myth. Madonna, which also gained a cult status amongst different audiences according to professor Sheila Jeffreys, has been called a Gesamtkunstwerk herself. Her critical reception, alongside her media coverage made Madonna one of the most "well-documented figures of the modern age". Both Madonna's references and impact are found —but not limited to— in the arts, literature, cinema, music and even science.

From a musical perspective and despite Madonna's music played a second place in scholarship analysis, she has been discussed with euphemism by multiple international authors as the "greatest" woman in music or arguably the most "influential" female artist in history. A large group of critics have retrospectively credited her presence, success and contributions with paving the way for female artists (as well she transcended gender) and changing the music scene for women in music —most notorious for dance and pop stages—with Billboard staff saying that "the history of pop music can essentially be divided into two eras: pre-Madonna and post-Madonna". In terms of record sales, Madonna is regarded as the best-selling woman in music history recognized by Guinness World Records since the late 20th-century. She is often called an influence by other artists.

She is also a polarizing figure. During her career, Madonna has attracted contradictory social-cultural attention from family organizations, feminists anti-porn, radical terrorists and religious groups worldwide with boycott, censorship and protests. In the early-2010s, the Islamic state banned her name. Her critics and detractors attribute Madonna being a variety of things, such as being an important element in the normalization of prostitutions in the malestream culture. Author Shmuley Boteach blamed her to "destroy the female recording industry by erasing the line that separates music from pornography". In addition and mainly in the late 20th-century, she was negatively nicknamed a "modern Medusa" and some authors advised that she restored the image of the Whore of Babylon, for which she was described by some as "the most sexually perverse female of the twentieth century". Despite being a subject of contradictions, numerous academic studies have considered the way Madonna polarizes views and deemed her as a site of ambiguity and openness.

Cultural significance

Defining Madonna's career and reputation (beyond boundaries of music and popular culture) 

The task of defining Madonna's social and cultural impact start by many authors tracing the boundaries she has crossed in both music and popular culture and became in a key aspect of who Madonna is to others. Overall, her career as a whole has been defined with attaining an "unusual" status which has also been integral to the formation in understanding her. Newsweek contributor, Eve Watling feels that "Madonna seems to have done so much in her life that it's hard to grasp that she's a real person". English music journalist, Paul Morley states what made her so ahead of her time, is that you can use her, colourise her, mix her, remix her, as part of your own narrative of meaning.

As a woman performer, more than one author attributed her a "near-singularity position" and it was explained by scholars Katie Milestone and Anneke Meyer from Manchester Metropolitan University in Gender and Popular Culture (2013) when they wrote "she has been heralded as a 'unique female' figure because of the control that she exerts over her identity". For American professor Arthur Asa Berger, "it is Madonna's power to create herself as a unique and distinctive icon that is so interesting".

More comments defining her career, came from Caryn Ganz's The New York Times as she mentioned that Madonna has a "singular career" (in music, fashion, movies and beyond) that's crossed boundaries and obliterated the status quo. Louis Virtel from Billboard argues that "the task of defining Madonna's impact is brutal" and viewed her career that amounts to "living mythology". The same author, writing for Paper emphasized that "she graduated from pop hero to mythological wonder". Singaporean magazine GameAxis Unwired explained that she pioneered a multifaceted career that "encompasses virtually every aspect of contemporary culture".

To American writer Christopher Zara, Madonna symbolizes "one of those rare artists who forced the world to conform to her". Another significance of her value and that a group of authors like writer Michael Levine and professor Thomas Ferraro have noted, is because Madonna has made a career of (virtual and literally) never doing the same thing twice. At this point, British journalist Bidisha said that the singer has "no interest in nostalgia". Matt Cain also shared similar thoughts praising her because she "never wanted to be seen as a nostalgia artist". South African author Helen Nicholson commented in 2010: "None of her albums sound or look the same".

Into the scope of Madonna as a musician, Gene N. Landrum, author of Profiles of Female Genius: Thirteen Creative Women who Changed the World (1994) wrote that "Madonna has been able to impact her industry as much as any woman in history". At her profile in The 100 Most Influential Musicians of All Time (2009) by Encyclopædia Britannica, Inc., staff proclaimed she "achieve levels of power and control unprecedented for a woman in the entertainment industry". Authors of 100 Entertainers Who Changed America (2013) explained that "her music alone cannot tell the full story of Madonna's colossal success and influence".

In 1990, the arts-based BBC1 series Omnibus broadcast a profile on Madonna. Cultural critic Michael Ignatieff of BBC2's The Late Show criticized the broadcast, arguing that Madonna was not a serious artist and the program was "an amazing abdication of editorial integrity." However, numerous authors have commented that Madonna "has transcended the role of being a musical artist", including American essayist Chuck Klosterman. For Klosterman, "Madonna's status is no longer connected to music or sales". Janice Min of Billboard declared that "Madonna is one of a  number of super-artists whose influence and career transcended music". In particular, American editor Annalee Newitz's thoughts were: "Madonna is not a musician. Certainly, she achieved fame within the music industry, but perhaps it might be more accurate to say that she began to be famous within the music industry". As her music played a second place for many, mainly intellectuals who were more interested in discussing what Madonna means, American music critic Steven Hyden summarized:

Authors also discussed her position in popular culture and how she transcended it. For instance, back in the 1990s, Robert Christgau sees Madonna as a pop cultural symbol but discusses the idea that she transcends popular culture. That idea was backed in the following decades (and perhaps before) by authors like Frenchman Georges-Claude Guilbert who says that long-time accepted as a pop icon, proposes the singer as a postmodern myth. Also, Russell Iliffe from PRS for Music wrote that "during her career, Madonna has transcended the term 'pop star' to become a global cultural icon". In 2015, an author from El Cultural wrote that she "surpasses the laws of physics, time, popular culture, and even metaphysics" as she become in a historical figure. Others authors like academic Camille Paglia concurred that she is a "historical figure".

General picture 
The cultural meaning of Madonna, and her impact vary from author to author, but there is a universal agreement on that from an international view both 20th and 21st centuries. A common observation, Romanian professor Doru Pop at Babeș-Bolyai University confirmed in his book The Age of Promiscuity (2018) that "the cultural impact of Madonna was extensively analyzed by many authors". That influence was described by Eve Watling of Newsweek whom expressed that "her enormous cultural impact seems Herculean" and concludes she defined the zeitgeist.

Jock McGregor of Christian organization L'Abri concluded that "by looking at her life and what she symbolizes we can learn much about the values and weaknesses of our culture. We may even learn something about ourselves". A similar suggestion was made in the late-2010s, by musicologist Eduardo Viñuela of University of Oviedo in conversation with Radio France Internationale (RFI) summarizing that "analyzing Madonna" is to delve into the evolution of many of the most relevant aspects of society in recent decades.

In 2018, British sociologist Ellis Cashmore said that "we can feel the effect of the changes she triggered in our everyday life". In 2009, art organization MiratecArts commented that "her influence is so powerful that it extends deep into the subconscious world of imagination, fantasy and dreams". In this way, contemporary observers have compared Madonna to Lilith and reinforcing this view, authors of Mythic Astrology Applied: Personal Healing Through the Planets (2004) wrote: "Many men and women have reported Madonna appearing in their dreams. As she has become a living archetype in our culture, it is no wonder that this is so". Kay Turner, an author turned-folklorist covered this area in her book I Dream of Madonna: Women's Dreams of the Goddess of Pop (1993) which is about the dreaming of 50 women on Madonna. American journalist Ricardo Baca described that "to some, Madonna is a divine creation —an otherworldly gift to the masses in the form of an incessantly morphing entity".

During part of her career, there was a general agreement that Madonna reflected society of her time. As professor John Izod of University of Stirling once said that she can be seen as a "hero of our times". On top of this, American professor Marjorie Garber stated that "perhaps more than any other has read the temper of the times". In similar vein, French editor Martine Trittoleno commented in 1993, that she is "more than a witness of the epoch, she is an active reflection of it". Argentine essayist and writer, Rodrigo Fresán described her in 2000, as "the mirror of our days".

In 1998, Madonna was suggested by Ann Powers of The New York Times as a "secular goddess, designated by her audience and pundits alike as the human face of social change". Around this decade, Like Powers, some academics described her as "a barometer of culture that directs the attention to cultural shifts, struggles and changes". British author George Pendle writing for Bidoun explained that she defined a way of living in the 1980s and 1990s and this led to her being consistently described as a "cultural icon". Many years after, her status as a cultural icon is acknowledged in all press accounts according to authors of Ageing, Popular Culture and Contemporary Feminism (2014). An author mentioned that "from day one, she was a full package of a way of living". As Venezuelan writer, Boris Izaguirre commented that "there is a 'Madonna generation' of people who have grown up with her". Prior years, in 2002, British academic researcher Brian McNair proposed that "Madonna more than made up for in iconic status and cultural influence".

In his study on Madonna in the late-1980s, media scholar John Fiske concluded that "she is neither a text or a person, but a set of meaning in process". Biographer Andy Koopmans observed the singer became in "a cultural obsession". To professor Lisa N. Peñaloza, she is a "veritable cultural production industry". As cultural critic Greil Marcus has it, "she is undeniably part of our culture". Within the compendium The Madonna companion: two decades of commentary, American poet Jane Miller proposes that "Madonna functions as an archetype directly inside contemporary culture" and she compared her with the Black Virgin. In the description of American author Strawberry Saroyan, Madonna is a "storyteller" and a "cultural pioneer". She stated: "Madonna's ability to take her message beyond music and impact women's lives has been her legacy". Professors and authors of Encyclopedia of Women in Today's World, Volume 1 (2011), described:

William Langley from The Daily Telegraph feels that "Madonna has changed the world's social history, has done more things as more different people than anyone else is ever likely to". Marissa G. Muller from W remarked that "Madonna has left her mark on every facet of culture".

In United States 

Madonna has been called an "American icon". Both her early impact and legacy in the culture of United States have been noted either by Americans or international authors. Compared to others USA-symbols like Marilyn Monroe, Elvis Presley, Barbie or Coca-Cola, academics in American Icons (2006) held that Madonna image "is immediately recognizable around the world and instantly communicates many of the values of U.S. culture". On a broader scale, a gender consultant and musicologist in a course dedicated to the singer at the University of Oviedo in 2015, proposes that her history and evolution is "comparable" and can be "useful to analyze the historical development of the United States".

In Fresán's view she is one of the "classic symbols of Made in USA". Another external perception came from French academic Guilbert whose expressed in Madonna as a Postmodern Myth (2002) that "today, America knows more about Madonna than about any passage of the Bible". Academics Johan Galtung and Daisaku Ikeda giving a perspective of the United States history commented: "US business and the hyper-successful US plebeian culture, outranking Christianity with its Penta-M: Mickey Mouse, Madonna, Michael (Jackson), McDonald's".

Her main's impact in the national culture was made through the 20th century. Associate professor Beretta E. Smith-Shomade of Emory University felt that only Madonna rivaled the space Oprah Winfrey occupied in the late twentieth century and in the psyche of national culture. In this period, she was constantly remarked by her sexual-feminist political movement. In the perspective of this American society from that era, Ann Powers said that "intellectuals described her as embodying sex, capitalism and celebrity itself". The major role she served within these areas in her country, was summarized by literary academic, E. San Juan Jr. whom goes on to suggest that it may not be inappropriate to speculate, that U.S. "civilization" finds in the legendary "expenditures" of superstar Madonna Ciccone the erotic representation of Social Darwinism as the dominant national ethos.

Retrospectively, Sara Marcus described with the height of her career, "the singer brought the changes to American culture". Marcus felt "her revelatory spreading of sexual liberation to Middle America, changed this country for the better. And that's not old news; we're still living it" and also ends saying that Madonna "remade American culture".

Caroline von Lowtzow from German newspaper Süddeutsche Zeitung commented that she turned in the female incarnation of the American Dream of the "self-made man". In this vein, U.S. cultural historian and author Jim Cullen wrote in 2001, that "few figures in American life have managed to exert as much control over their destinies as she has, and the fact that she has done so as a woman is all the more remarkable". Cullen also expressed "that Madonna has done this is indisputable". At some point of her career, indeed, Madonna was climax of the itinerary of U.S. nationalism to a transnational according to E. San Juan Jr. To professor Thomas Ferraro, "no one was more important to the culture as whole than Madonna" as he further expanded it: "Miracle worker and wonder woman, she was the faith healer of Ronald Reagan's divide and—conquer American, for its youth especially". Professor Robert Miklitsch, said that she was "the perfect symbol for Reagan-era America".

Scholar Frances Negrón-Muntaner examined that on a "global scale" Madonna embodied the freedom, in/morality, and material "excess" of (white) America. Historian professor Glen Jeansonne gives his point saying that she "freed Americans from their inhibitions and made them feel good about having fun". For Scottish author Andrew O'Hagan "Madonna is like a heroic opponent of cultural and political authoritarianism of the American "establishment".

Modern culture (popular culture) 

For some observers, she is more a pop icon rather than a musician, as critic Stephen Holden once pointed out: "Madonna is still much more significant as a pop culture symbol than as a songwriter or singer". As was usual with Madonna, an array group of commentators have pondered her influence in popular culture. At first instance, professor Deborah Bell states that her impact "on pop culture is immeasurable". In 2003, Harper's Bazaar held that "the ultimate pop-culture icon('s) ... influence is endless". Historically, she is the first multimedia figure in popular culture according to the Rock and Roll Hall of Fame.

On a broader scale, her influence and contributions in the modern popular culture have been widely remarked by many. In 2019, The A.V. Club editors Alex McLevy and Kelsey J. Waite commented that as she "is modern pop's original icon" her influence will be "shared, enjoyed, and debated for decades to come". In this vein, British sociologist Ellis Cashmore provided a justification saying that "even allowing for exaggeration, the point is that Madonna changed 'how the game works'". Cashmore goes on to suggest even if she wasn't single-handedly responsible for moving the tectonic plates of popular culture, "there is a sense in which she was an archetype: others who aspired to become celebs were going to have to follow her example. Conspicuousness was everything". Matt Cain is from the idea that "without her, from music to fashion to the whole concept of celebrity, today's pop culture landscape would simply not exist as it is". Noah Robischon from Entertainment Weekly has concurred that she "has defined, transcended, and redefined pop culture". American writer Gayl Jones even used the term "the Madonna culture".

In multiple views and for decades, diverse international outlets have deemed Madonna as "the top figure" of popular culture or have given her an unusual status against almost any other entertainment figure. Across the 21st-century, those comments include the point of view of Belfast Telegraph columnist Gail Walker, whom compared her in 2008, to fellows or newer artists with saying that "she is from an entirely different universe", adding that "not even male icons have stayed at the front of popular culture the way she has". In 2018, Rolling Stone staff remarked her "ability to stay at the center of pop culture for longer than nearly anyone". In 2012, Latin critics like Víctor Lenore perceived the singer as the most influential presence of popular culture at that time. In 2015, a scholar from program "Research in the Disciplines" of Rutgers University said that "Madonna has become the world's biggest and most socially significant pop icon, as well as the most controversial". Commemorating her 60th birthday, The Guardian presented a series of articles discussing her figure in the point of views of multiple observers, including columnists and artists. In one of them, The Observer columnist Barbara Ellen called her the "pop's greatest survivor". In 2015, Elysa Gardner of USA Today named her "our most durable pop star". In summary, this continued perception was expressed by media consultants and authors of Media Studies: The Essential Resource (2013): "Madonna continues to be a challenging presence within popular culture".

Feminism

Sex symbol

Fashion

Musicianship 

Her contributions to music have been appreciated by multiple critics, which have also been known to induce controversy. Madonna's music influence has been largely applauded. In summary and according to associate dean Jacqueline Edmondson, her continued importance radiates that "her legacy is important to understanding issues surrounding gender and the music industry in the twenty-first century".

From a popular view, Madonna's voice talent has been famously denied. Another group of commentators, however, have praised Madonna's vocals and versatility in many ways. In this latter group, scholars Andy Bennett and Steve Waksman, in The SAGE Handbook of Popular Music (2014) agreed that "for pop singers in the style of Madonna, brilliant singing ability is not of utmost important" indeed, "the ordinariness of Madonna's vocal talent is key to her appeal". Both Bennett and Waksman compared it to African-American artists of souls or R&B genres, "whose considerable vocal skill is a crucial aspect of their success". They also extended the idea that by contrast, the fact that listeners can sing along to Madonna with ease, can hear themselves reflected in her voice, and can, perhaps, image themselves in her place, are all significant to her role as a pop star.

In Settling the Pop Score: Pop Texts and Identity Politics (2017), professor Stan Hawkins wrote that "her musical texts should not be dismissed in view of their 'simplistic formulae'". He goes on to suggest that "at a general level, Madonna's sound points towards a specific historical moment in pop music, where representational strategies became exceptionally polyvalent". Dr. Susan Hopkins has concurred that "Madonna's music is remembered not for its technical complexity but for the accompanying visuals".

In 1986, Dr. Karl Podhoretz of the University of Dallas called her a "revolutionary voice who has altered the very meaning of sound in our time". Three decades later, in 2018, Rolling Stone described the singer as "the most important female voice in the history of modern music". Dutch linguist Theo van Leeuwen cited her as perhaps "the first singer who used quite different voices for different songs".

Reputation 

Madonna attained an unusual status as a music performer and female singer. In 2021, Emirati editor Saeed Saeed from The National stated that "we do hold her to a higher standard" since "we are used to the 'Material Girl' dictating music trends for the best part of four decades". He further notes that "Madonna's worst albums are considered a solid offering when compared to other artists". In similar vein, Xavi Sancho from El País commented in 2014, that "the releases of this woman are not mere musical and commercial events", but rather exercises that marked the way forward and to certify the things.

Historically, she is credited to popularize and being "the first" in numerous concepts within music industry. At first instance, and understanding these attributions, Madonna is commonly credited as the "first female" to have complete control of her music and image by a wide group of observers such as Roger Blackwell and Stephen Thomas Erlewine. In context, Ana Laglere, an editor of Batanga Media explained that before Madonna, record labels determined every step of artists but she introduced her style and conceptually directed every part of her career. Associate professor Carol Benson and Allen Metz commented that the singer entered the music business with definite ideas about her image, but "it was her track record that enabled her to increase her level of creative control over her music". Francesca Cavallo and Elena Favilli have also explained that in those days, "it was very rare for female artists to be the masters of their own destiny: they would let their male managers, producers, and agents make most of their decisions for them. Not Madonna". Mary Cross pointed out that "she is not the product of some music industry idea, but her own woman".

From a general picture, a vast group of international critics and media outlets have said that her presence is defined for "changing" or "revolutionize" contemporary music history for women's (and even regardless gender), mainly dance and pop scene. Reviews beyond of gender perspective, includes Greek adjunct lecturer, Constantine Chatzipapatheodoridis whose said that "Madonna's cultural impact helped shape the contemporary music stage, in terms of sound and image, performance, sex and fandom", as well reinvention. Another consideration came from author Marshawn Evans, whose wrote in her book S.K.I.R.T.S in the Boardroom (2013) that Madonna "has also revolutionized how music is performed, delivered to the masses, purchased, packaged, downloaded, and even simulcast across a variety of cutting-edge platforms". In 1984, Billboard commented that the simultaneous releases of LP, cassette and CD was pioneered with Madonna.

Like Evans and Chatzipapatheodoridis, others group of authors viewed how Madonna paved the way for pop releases. Thomas R. Harrison, an associate professor of music business and recording at Jacksonville University said that the singer changed the way pop artists were marketed. Another supporter of this view was Erica Russell from MTV whose states that Madonna helped shape the way pop artists release music adding that "reignite interest in the art of the concept album within mainstream pop" after the decline of the rock-oriented concept album in the 1980s. In another suggestion, Marissa Muller from W felt that she "normalized the idea that pop stars could and should write their own songs".

Focusing the attention to women's music history and pop stage, her figure was summarized by authors of Ageing, Popular Culture and Contemporary Feminism (2014), arguing that she "is widely considered to have defined the discursive space for examining female popular music". Another foundational example was included in Encyclopedia of American Social History (1993), as the authors agreed: "No singer better illustrates the new images of women in contemporary rock and pop than Madonna".

Further commentaries, in these two scenarios of women's music and popular music, include Deutsche Welle staff, as they credited the singer as "the first woman to dominate the male world of pop". British sociologist David Gauntlett, for example, cited a commentary from an author: "Madonna, whether you like her or not, started a revolution amongst women in music". Joe Levy, Blender editor-in-chief makes a similar argument in discussing this, saying: She "opened the door for what women could achieve and were permitted to do". Overall, in the perception of actress and activist, Susan Sarandon: "The history of women in popular music can, pretty much, be divided into before and after Madonna". Billboard staff also recognized that "the history of pop music can essentially be divided into two eras: pre-Madonna and post-Madonna".

She has been also discussed with euphemism by various international authors and media outlets as the "greatest" female artist or arguably the most "influential" woman in music history. Ben Kelly writing for The Independent gave his thoughts on this saying that she has "ensured her legacy as the greatest female artist of all time". Music outlets such as MTV or BET have deemed her as the most influential figure or woman in American music history as well. Spanish cultural critic, Víctor Lenore named her as "the greatest female myth" in the history of popular music.

Music videos and performances 

Cultural and historically, her music videos concentrated much of her scrutiny in music terms, and she became "the most analyzed" figure from the rest of female music video performers. Madonna is also cited by others as "the first female artist to exploit fully the potential of the music video", a statement included in her profile at Encyclopædia Britannica written by Lucy O'Brien. The major role Madonna has played in the history of music videos, was commented by professor Norman Fairclough, whom suggested that "the evolution of the music video could indeed be studied through Madonna". Film critic Armond White credited that she popularized the music video. By some, the singer pioneered lipsynching and extensive choreography in the video format.

The written about Madonna's performances are also large. From a popular view, music critic Michael Heatley held that she "had always set high standards with her stage shows". While she wasn't the first performer in using wireless microphone headset in her concerts, author Drew Campbell called the "Madonna effect" to the "Madonna mic" that was bulky and black and high-tech, and "no one cared if it was visible".

In terms of influence, multiple agents have credited to Madonna with "creating" the modern concert tour. One of these observers, William Baker mentioned that "the modern pop concert experience was created by Madonna really". In other areas, she was credited by another group like scholars Berrin Yanıkkaya and Angelique Nairn, to paved the way of extravaganza in concerts as a theatrical spectacle in which the female music artist is placed centre stage. If a specific title is mentioned, it is generally Blond Ambition World Tour. In this line, Jacob Bernstein of The New York Times cited previous examples like Donna Summer or Michael Jackson, but Madonna's 1990 tour "was bigger, bolder and more imaginative" for which she set the tone and the bar of modern megatours.

Although Madonna is typically credited to set the template for stadium-sized spectacle according to BBC, she told the press in 2017, that wanted "to reinvent pop tours"  exploring smaller-scale show and intimate shows in order to speak with the audience. She explored this prior years with Madonna: Tears of a Clown, and later with the all-theater tour Madame X Tour. For Stuart Lenig of Columbia State Community College, over the decades, "Madonna's carefully choreographed and performed shows became a gold standard of pop theatre, inspiring others to re-embrace the stage".

Other critics noted that Madonna divided her performances into thematic categories and it was unusual for concerts during her time and from a creative level. According to Baker, that split of sections derived that pretty much everyone copies or everyone is inspired by. As stage performances seemed essential to developing her ever-changing personas and allowed her to create "exotic places" that she could control, Madonna told Rolling Stone in 1987: "I've always liked to have different characters that I project". Unlike other performers, whom spend few weeks developing a show, Madonna has the budget to spend up to three months.

Popularization of music things 
In music terms, Madonna is credited to popularize various genres among other related music things. For example:

According to writer Arie Kaplan, Madonna is pioneer and popularized subgenre of dance-pop. Music critic Stephen Thomas Erlewine said that she had a "huge role in popularizing dance music". In another illustrative example, she has credit for the introduction of electronic music to the stage of popular music. British sociologist David Gauntlett said that she introduced European electronic music into the mainstream of American pop culture. According to the company The Vinyl Factory, her single "Vogue" popularized the usage of Korg M1.

Literature about Madonna 

At some point of her career, Madonna was heralded as the most talked about subject within female singers or celebrities either in terms of popular culture, music industry or academia. For instance, Andreas Häger from Åbo Akademi University cited that "hardly any other popular artist has received as much attention from the scientific community as Madonna". Professor Imelda Whelehan of University of Western Australia provides a perspective that ran like this: "Is easy the most overdetermined figure. The most studied, critically acclaimed, derided and analysed of the performers". Douglas Kellner proclaimed her as "the most discussed female singer in popular music". On a broader scale, Madonna was described as "one of the most fascinating, uninhibited and well-documented figures of the modern age" in her profile at Rock and Roll Hall of Fame.

Authors have attempted to measure the literature on Madonna metaphorically. As media scholar David Tetzlaff equated reading it all to "mapping the vastness of the cosmos". Indeed, Tetzlaff called her a "metatextual girl". Rolling Stone also mentioned there is an "extraordinary amount of words written about her". Robert Miklitsch, associate professor of Ohio University observed as well, there is an "extensive literature on Madonna". Stephen Brown from University of Ulster commented that "the literature on Madonna is almost mind-boggling in its abundance". According to American writer Alina Simone and author of Madonnaland (2016), encountered there is no dearth of material about Madonna, but an "overwhelming excess". Guilbert compared that "it has become hard to open a book that has to do with U.S. popular culture without encountering some mention of Madonna".

Authors on Madonna and terminology 
Academics or pundits who specializes in Madonna (or her own academic branch: Madonna studies) have been called different ways. Authors from Henry Allen to Guilbert, used the name of "Madonnologists". Others observers such as Anne Hull or Robert Christgau referred to the intellectuals working on Madonna as "Madonna scholars". Same or different authors used several neologisms to describe commentaries about the singer. For instance, Christgau used the phrase "Madonnathink".

Academics like  Camille Paglia has been called a "Madonna enthusiast". "Madonnaholics" was another tag. Others were presented as "Madonna experts" in the popular press, like the case of Matthew Rettenmund in a Billboard article from 2015. Another group of her pundits were called "Madonna historians", like Taraborelli did in his book Madonna: An Intimate Biography with Bruce Baron.

Furthermore, Mark D. Hulsether cited in Religion and Popular Culture in America by Bruce Forbes, divided her critics and audiences into Madonna-hater (MH) and Madonna-lover (ML). In the same way, some of her critics were called  Madonnaphobes (or madonophobics) and Madonnophiles (or madonophilics); both a blend words of Madonna and phobia and paraphilia, respectively.

Race politics

Cultural appropriation and multiculturalism 

Another consideration focused in understanding Madonna's impact have been both her relationship or "appropriation" with diverse subcultures and group's imaginary adding a value in her contributions and work. In doing so, these things transcended her own figure and various studiers have found a significance. Many scholars focused their attention with a specific group or race; like bell hooks did with the black culture. In summary, the Madonna studies also provided a challenge views on racial perspectives. Professor George J. Leonard, one of the contributors of The Italian American Heritage (1998) called her "the last ethnic and the first post-ethnic diva".

Madonna indeed, deliberately cemented her popularity on ambiguity, thus appealing to not one but many social groups and subcultures. As Matt Cain remarked that she "has always produced work that has brought marginalised groups to the fore", for instance, gay, Latino or black culture. Author Shelleen Greene described "Madonna's racial tourism" and pointed out that for the millennial pop divas, anyone can have "blonde ambition" regardless of race.

To Douglas Kellner, Madonna "helped bring marginal groups and concerns into the cultural mainstream". An author said that "by making culture generally available, Madonna becomes the culture of all social classes". Canadian professor Karlene Faith gave her point of view saying that Madonna's peculiarity is that "she has cruised so freely through so many cultural terrains" and she "has been a 'cult figure' within self-propelling subcultures just as she became a major".

A concern derived from Madonna's ambivalent impact and position within these themes, is the academic interrogation that she has focused on her appropriations, subversions and transformations but her motivations in addressing cultural politics are uncertain to many. At some point of her career, some have argued, for example that Madonna's insistence on solidarity with marginal groups and on moving between worlds was "duplicitous". British professor Yvonne Tasker articulates her ambivalence, calling her an "interesting figure to the extent that her appropriation does at times work to question assumptions". Taking her as a paragon, assistant professors Jennifer Esposito and Erica B. Edwards have commented that "pop stars today contend with this legacy and as a result take elements adding 'freshness' to their persona without dealing with the histories and realities the cultural imprints are born of".

In addition, diverse examples have been documented in textbooks and other outlets her impact and footprints in some countries' culture, like La Nación, South China Morning Post and El País did with her history in Argentina, Hong Kong and Spain, respectively in terms of visits and collateral-relationship. Madonna's mapping of the world cohabits with her singing in other languages. Partially or fully, aside of her native English, she also sung in Spanish ("Verás" or "Lo Que Siente La Mujer"), French ("La Vie en rose" or "Je t'aime... moi non plus"), Portuguese ("Faz Gostoso"), Sanskrit ("Shanti/Ashtangi") or Euskara ("Sagarra jo").

Black culture 

According to a 1990 article of CineAction!, "Madonna's 'blackness' is a common, though poorly articulated theme of popular press literature". As with other ethnics, Madonna commented about black culture, recalling that she wanted to be black as a child.

Madonna is typically credited as the first to use black gay culture, in a clear and forward way. Professor Ferraro studied her relationship with black culture, saying that "no white pop star (in the 1980s and 1990s) ever owes more to black male productions, to black-style dance and stage presentation, including Reggie Lucas, Nile Rogers, and Stephen Bray, than Madonna". Professor also states that "no diva has spent more time on camera and off with men of color, professionally and romantically involved" and ends describing her as "the most accomplished Italian-to-black crossover artist in history".

However, she has faced criticism in her usage of black sub-culture themes and was viewed by some as a white privilege. Barbadian-British historian Andrea Stuart found that she "deliberately affected black style to attract a wider audience". American historian David Roediger noticed bell hooks' criticism (a famous Madonna detractor), that for her "the image Madonna most exploits is that of the quintessential 'white girl'. To maintain that image she must always position herself as an outsider in relation to black culture". Art historian John A. Walker, also observed criticism from hooks, and concluded that this caused many women of colour to dislike Madonna.

American culture and Italianness (Italian-American identity) 

Authors remarked her background as an Italian-American and she identified herself as such. Fosca D'Acierno wrote in The Italian American Heritage (1998) that "so much has been written about Madonna, but rather little has been about" singer's "Italianness". Other group of authors suggested that she "has traded on ethnicities other than her own (Italian American)".

Particularly, D'Acierno studied at that time how she became a vehicle for the expression of many of the qualities that are exclusive not only to Italians but for Italian American women. Professor Thomas Ferraro also studied her "Italianness" praising her because "never stops talking about her background", although all of them remarked that she does not affirm her cultural background and identity singing in Italian. At other point, the singer has been described as one of the Italian American performers that played a "definitive role" in the musical culture.

Musically speaking, various critics agree that Madonna, rather than export US music, has imported new (mostly European danceclub) trends into the United States. In terms of iconography, US culture does not seem to have played a central role in her work either, according to José Igor Prieto-Arranz from University of the Balearic Islands. For example, she rarely wrapped herself (metaphorically or literally) in the American flag, but has often adopted other flags of convenience.

Asian and other cultures 
Mostly in her 1992–1993 and 1998–2001 periods, Madonna also adopted, modified, subverted and deconstructed Asian (specially Thai, Hindu and Japanese) elements and imagery. She also replicated the practice of hiring Asian and African American backup singers and dancers.

Like with other races, Madonna's reception with Asians and Asian Americans have been also studied in surveys. An example occurred with scholars Thomas K. Nakayama and Lisa N. Peñaloza, and most of them, according to their study felt "alienated by the visual narratives of her early videos, and clearly distanced themselves from politics of the visual texts". Other observers also noticed the influence of England heritage in her work, as she was married to Guy Ritchie and lived in the United Kingdom for years. However, Madonna's exploration of intra-Caucasian identities has received little academic attention.

Latino and Spanish culture 

She has also had a strong relationship with the Latin culture, as Jorge Becerra from LatinAmerican Post says. Professor Santiago Fouz-Hernández in his book Madonna's Drowned Worlds states that the Hispanic culture "is perhaps the most influential and revisited 'ethnic' style in her work". Another example is her personal life, including relationships like with Carlos Leon to whom she gave birth to Lourdes "Lola" Maria Ciccone Leon. In many ways, she was viewed as a precursor of the Latino boom-way started in the 1990s, with early works such as "La Isla Bonita", and that other American pop singers such Jennifer Lopez, Beyonce or Christina Aguilera have replicated.

Frances Negrón-Muntaner discussed in Boricua Pop: Puerto Ricans and the Latinization of American Culture (2004) Madonna's impact in the Latin culture of the United States and mainly, Puerto Ricans during the 1980s and through the 1990s. Equally important, author suggested that "Madonna's nod created the illusion of insider status for Latinos of all sexualities in U.S. culture". As Thomas K. Nakayama and Lisa N. Peñaloza found: "Latinos tended to respond to Madonna texts in a way that underscored their specific cultural literacy".

Focused the attention to Puerto Ricans, Negrón-Muntaner describes the singer as the one who "came to most successfully commodify boricua cultural practices for all to see". She was also described by the same author as the first "white pop star to make boricuas the overt object of her affections" and this "produced a queer juncture for Puerto Ricans representation in popular culture" and in "romancing Latinos in this specific way, Madonna made boricua men desirable to an unprecedented degree in (and through) mass culture.

Like Negrón-Muntaner, other writers closely examined her impact in Puerto Rico, including Carmen R. Lugo-Lugo whose article The Madonna Experience (2001) for the feminist academic journal Frontiers: A Journal of Women Studies, explored the "political aspect of the Madonna phenomenon in Puerto Rico by looking at her and her status as a public figure", as well Madonna's impact in the Puerto Rican young girl culture of the 1980s.

The incident with the Puerto Rican flag during her concert in the island as part of The Girlie Show in 1993, was also cited by various authors, with Carlos Pabón calling it in his essay De Albizu a Madonna: Para armar y desarmar la nacionalidad (2003) as "a story that has no parallel in the imaginary of the country". In Argentina, another Latin country, Madonna's relationship was briefly divided after her film of Evita, with criticism mainly from the Federal Peronism.

Madonna in the contemporary arts

Commercial influence 

Madonna's semiotic and influence also extended to business schools sphere and marketing community. More than one economist, marketer, entrepreneur or other business expert made analysis or dedicated courses studying her continued "success" and commercial "strategies" with academic Douglas Kellner saying that "one cannot fully grasp the Madonna phenomenon without analyzing her marketing strategies", tactics that have been "essential" to her success. In Understanding Popular Music, New Zealand professor Roy Shuker wrote that "the continued success of Madonna provides a fascinating case study of the nature of star appeal in popular music". At this point, writer Andrew Morton has concurred that "her success has certainly impressed the business community and senior professors at Harvard Business School beat a path to her door".

Kelley School of Business commented that "she is someone everyone can learn from, though the lessons run counter to conventional marketing wisdom of the 4Ps variet". Economist and scholar Robert M. Grant dedicated a class on her in 2008 highlighting the context of "intensely competitive" and "volatile world of entertainment". Marketer expert and professor Stephen Brown from University of Ulster named her a "marketing genius" while studied her case. In addition, Martin Kupp and Jamie Anderson in a study dedicated to her in London Business School, concluded that she "is a born entrepreneur". In 2013, athlete turned science writer, Christopher Bergland wrote in Psychology Today an article analyzing her enduring success from the perspective of neuroscience.

Others created new phrases or terms using Madonna as a quintessential for business. For instance, business professor Oren Harari coined the expression "Madonna effect" inspired in her business tactics and changes while deems its use for both individuals and organizations. Doctor Peter van Ham writing for NATO Review explained the "Madonna-curve", an expression used by some business analysts to describe the "adapting to new tasks whilst staying true to one's own principles". He further explained that "businesses use Madonna as a role model of self-reinvention".

Success and longevity 

The terms "success" and "longevity" has been scrutinized in Madonna's case by multiple agents and how this shaped the views beyond her own figure. Thales de Menezes from Brazilian newspaper Folha de S.Paulo commented in 1999, that she is "rare case of a lasting relationship with success". Others commentatros have described both her longevity and success as "unparalleled", like David Thomas from MTV Australia in 2013.

Some observers start remarking Madonna's beginnings when critics like Robert Hilburn were already "predicting" her rapid decline. Others compared her to new debutants like Billboard magazine editor, Paul Grein did with Cyndi Lauper; the singer to whom she was first compared and Madonna was viewed "somewhat less talented than" her. Grein said: "Cyndi Lauper will be around for a long time; Madonna will be out of the business in six months". Shuker commented that "Madonna's critical status has moved beyond the earlier negative views". In short, Madonna later "set a template" of longevity and enduring success as was suggested by more than one author. In a bigger proportion, and more than anyone else, she ended "embodie[d] female success in a male-dominated industry".

The longevity attached to Madonna can be traced back to at least 1991, or in other words, before having a 10-years-old career. At that time, outlets started to describe her career from "veteran" to have the "equivalent to five lifetimes in rock-star years". Diverse outlets in many parts of the world, provided contemporary views, like Australian newspaper The Canberra Times in 1992, whom staff attributed her ability to change her image frequently as the "secret of Madonna's longevity". In 1994, author Gene N. Landrum described her success at that time in the following way: "Her success has made her the most visible show business personality of the era, and arguably of the century". As she accumulated success in many ways in her next decades, British sociologist David Gauntlett said that the singer has provided a recipe for "longevity", which many artists, female and male, may try to emulate.

At some point of her career, many of her "scandals" or works were predicted to be the "end of her career" because she "gone too far", like when she published her first book Sex accompanied of the album Erotica and the NC-17 movie, Body of Evidence. It was around this time, in 1993, media scholar David Tetzlaff observed that singularity: "Never before has a popular performer survived so much hype for so long and continued to attract the fascination of a broad public while staying completely contemporary". Tetzlaff goes on to suggests: "The cultural longevity of Liz Taylor or even Elvis Presley has been largely based in nostalgia [...] and others have been around "forever" but have only occasionally, if ever, been associated with the level of publicity that constantly envelops Madonna". By this point, Tetzlaff mentioned The Beatles as an only comparable example to Madonna's case. Virtually over the decades, similar views was suggested by commentators like Jennifer Egan (2002) or LZ Granderson (2012), for example. In 2018, many years after Tetzlaff's claims, Cashmore held that she both epitomized and helped usher in an age in which the epithets "shocking", "disgusting" or "filthy" didn't presage the end of a career. Furthermore, professor Robert Miklitsch noted that she responded with her 1995 song "Human Nature" to her critics about her longevity with the phrase: "Did I stay too long?".

As she turned older, perception have been ambivalent towards Madonna's longevity and success, but mainly contrasted because her long-position as usually a "top artist". In 2020, author Bobby Borg suggested, for example, "no matter which period of her career you examine, Madonna has remained one step ahead of the pop competition and at the forefront of the music and fashion". Contrary, in Fresán's view: "As far as I'm concerned, Madonna now lives off the shock wave of a Big Bang that has already passed and gives off the visible but distant light of a dead star. A dead star but, yes, very intelligent". Deborah Jermyn from University of Roehampton provides an explanation saying that her "frequency is generally steady until key moments in her career produce intense spikes of activity".

In general, Guinness World Records have referred to her as "the most successful female artist" in both 20th and 21st centuries. The same or similar description has been used in academic fields. A summary of this point was provided by scholars writing for Journal of Business Research in 2020, Canavan Brendan and Claire McCamley when they concluded that "she's probably the most successful female music artist ever in terms of her record sales, tour receipts, brand recognition and longevity". British musicologist David Nicholls also suggested: "Madonna became the most successful woman in music history by skillfully evoking, inflecting, and exploiting the tensions implicit in a variety of stereotypes and images of women". In 2015, gender consultant and musicologist Laura Viñuela taught at University of Oviedo that "is the only woman who has such a long and massively successful career in the world of music".

Through the years, another group of authors used superlatives to refer her status, success or impact in the field of music industry. Biographer Chris Dicker summarized that it has been said that she is "the most successful woman in the history of the music business". Following Dicker's summary, outlets like Deutsche Welle called her "music business' most successful woman". Another similar description was used by David Horowitz and professor Peter N. Carroll, as they deemed her "the most financially successful female entertainer in history".

As a businesswoman 

She also received appreciation from a varied of industry experts in her role as a businesswoman and once named "America's smartest businesswoman". That treatment was then unusual for a female singer and was remarked by author Gene N. Landrum (1994) whom commented that "Madonna's business acumen and entrepreneurial talent were becoming legend when such bastions of male capitalism as Forbes" named her such as. Around this time, she was one of the few female CEOs in the industry.

By this time, Madonna's business tactics were distinctly different from other artists as she was reported to endorses products she thinks will enhance her, more than the product. According to biographer Adam Sexton, she was praised by people who work with her as they "agree that she is a rarity among entertainers, who runs her own business affairs". One of these observers, Jeffrey Katzenberg then chairman of Disney Studios, described: "She has a very strong hand in deal-making and financing of her enterprises. Nothing gets done without her participation".

For many of these observers, Madonna transcended her roles of musician and pop icon in becoming a businesswoman. At first instance, Jennifer Egan noticed that a "popular answer" among critics, "she's done (all about her life and work) it through sheer business savvy". In this vein,  her business profile quickly became in a signature for her career, while commentators used numerous adjectives to remark that status. Authority sources like Kelley School of Business, for example, said that she is more than a "pop cult icon" and has been "an empire from day one". Professor Robert Miklitsch described that "[she] is herself a corporation and a rather diverse one at that" in his book From Hegel to Madonna (1998). American author Kevin Sessums used a similar description calling her "a corporation in the form of flesh". Colin Barrow a visiting scholar at the Cranfield School of Management viewed her as "an organisation unto herself". New Zealand professor Roy Shuker agreed and said that she "must be viewed as much as an economic entity as she is a cultural phenomenon" adding that she "represents a bankable image". Kellner also viewed her as "one of the greatest PR machines in history".

Overall, her contributions in helping "to shape" music businesses was appreciated by Lucy O'Brien whose said that she became the first one "to exploit the idea" of pop artist as a brand in the 1980s. Editor Gerald Marzorati proposes that "Madonna's contribution has been to usher in the phenomenon of star as multimedia impresario". David Bruenger from Ohio State University observed Madonna's economic impact and wrote in Making Money, Making Music: History and Core Concepts (2016) that "she pioneered [various] brand management strategies". In Bitch She's Madonna (2018) authors go beyond previous descriptions, saying that "the music business, as we have seen it grow, is what it is largely because of her, her ambition, her vision and her perfectionism, along with her undeniable musical and entrepreneurial power and talent.

Brand 

In terms of branding, experts have attributed to Madonna a particular position. South African author Helen Nicholson, goes to suggest Madonna is the "Queen of Branding". From an overview perspective, New Zealand academic Warwick Murray among others have called her a "global brand". To some, she is "a quintessential brand".

Madonna is perhaps the epitome of celebrity marketing and celebrity branding, according to Jim Joseph, author of The Experience Effect (2010). Public relations expert, Michael Levine reviewed her then 20-years-old career in A Branded World (2003) praising her beyond any other artist as the most successful act in establishing and maintaining a brand. Levine also said: "Establishing herself as something different right from the start, [she] has bucked every trend and every rule of Branding and still managed to become the most well-known, well considered brand in the entertainment business".

Another consideration came from marketing executive Sergio Zyman whom stated that "unlike almost anyone else in her business, has an uncanny ability to retool the Madonna brand". Zyman also believes that "no one repositions herself as well —or as frequently— as Madonna". From a cultural perspective, Timothi Jane Graham of American business magazine Success commented that Madonna's brand has been a "mirror of our own journey through pop culture and as a people" with her transformation. American business magazine, Fast Company discussed her in a 2015 article as "the biggest pop brand on the planet".

Financial accomplishments 

Another group of authors whom pondered her cultural significance, have reviewed her role as a boss and business accomplishments noting the impact this have had in her career and beyond Madonna's own figure. Clifford Thompson, author of Contemporary World Musicians (2020) wrote that she "has been overwhelmingly successful on a financial level". As she was described itself a product, the singer was called an "economic phenomenon". Authors of the academic compendium The Madonna Connection (1993) wrote that she became herself a "valuable property in the world of international capital". Newspaper ABC named her in 1992, as the "most prolific, profitable and universal consumer object since the commercialization of Coca-Cola". Another author deemed the singer as "her own entertainment industry".

Commercially, Madonna generated sales for Warners of over $1.2 billion in the first decade of her career ( 1983–1993). She also added hundreds of millions more for other companies. Total lifetime worldwide sales for Madonna's CD's and other music products were at least $2 billion as of 2003, according to her publicist Liz Rosenberg. According to an investigation by Judson Rosebush, Madonna accounted for something like 20 to 33 percent of all record sales from Warner Communications, or over $200 million and she even affected the stock. In fact, author Robert Burnett reported that Time Warner "usually feature[d] Madonna's picture prominently in its annual report". In the 1990s, a group of authors like academic Roy Shuker deemed the singer as arguably "Time Warner's most effective corporate symbol". Others commented that "the real value that Madonna has to offer a multinational conglomerate cannot be calculated in sales figures alone".

A contract she signed with Time Warner in 1992, made her then highest-paid female entertainer in history. Under this agreement, she founded the entertainment company Maverick which included the record label, Maverick Records. It was recognized by Spin as the most successful "vanity label" and while under Madonna's control it generated well over $1 billion for Warner Bros. Records, more money than any other recording artist's record label at that time.

According to Taraborrelli, the existence of Maverick Records was "anomaly" as she became in one of the first female artists to have a "real label", and one of the few women to run her own entertainment company. During her time with this conglomerate, she attained "significant patronage". At any rate, she helped Asians or Europeans to become famous in the U.S, as she made it possible for the Chinese film Farewell, My Concubine to reach a relatively large American public.

In addition, she has been included in several Forbes lists since the 1980s and once named the richest woman in music. Thompson noticed that "for several years running, she was listed in Forbes as one of the 10 highest-paid entertainers".

Publicity and advertisements 

Madonna has also made an impact in the world of advertisements and publicity in many ways, including cultural and commercial perspectives. Christopher John Farley commented that her career has "never really been about music", but about other stuffs like publicity. A similar description was used by authors of Challenging Theory (1999): "Madonna's success is founded not on her lyrical art or musical talent but on her skill as self-publicist". Martin Amis described something that was a constant by some point of her career, as he saw that "her publicity gets publicity".

Sociologist Cashmore, praised her influence in this area saying that "Madonna was the first celebrity to render her manufacture completely transparent". He further explained that "unabashed about revealing to her fandom evidence of the elaborate and monstrously expensive publicity and marketing that went into [her work], and indeed, herself, Madonna laid open her promotional props". In 1992, American journalist Michael Gross presenting her as "the world's most advanced human publicity-seeking missile".

Madonna's debut occurred at the same time the relationship with music and advertisings marked a "new era", including the association with music videos and the MTV generation. By that time, critics like Simon Frith, however, noticed that for years she refused to do an ad. For instance, her first nationwide advertisement was until her contribution on the first Rock the Vote campaign in 1990.

Her first major advertisement debut was in Japan, with a Mitsubishi Electric campaign in 1987 to promote a videocassette recorder (VCR). Her collaboration doubled company's share of the domestic VCR market to 13%, and erased the corporation's image of being "safe but bland" as researchers found that most Japanese no longer considered Mitsubishi Electric a conservative company. Beyond her impact in Mitsubishi, Madonna campaign led to Japanese agencies and advertisers to feature musicians in advertising, again invigorating the overall interest in using foreign celebrities in advertising. Since that time, many foreign artists have appeared in Japanese TV commercials.

She made her Western advertising debut with "Make a Wish" for Pepsi in 1989. In a single night, an estimated 300 million people from 40 countries viewed the commercial. The event constituted the single largest one-day media buy in the history of advertising. Similar to a jingle the video was accompanied with the song "Like a Prayer", marking the first time that a videoclip was planned as an advertisement. The significance of Pepsi-Madonna cross-promotional collaboration has been studied by numerous observers, either for Pepsi advertising, the Cola wars, and Madonna's business acumen. For J. Randy Taraborrelli, these events surrounding Madonna-Pepsi partnership, "turned out to be one of the biggest controversies in the history of corporate advertising's often uneasy liaison with pop music". Status for both company and Madonna were typified at this time, as one of the largest companies part of Fortune 500, and she as the "most famous woman" on the world, or "world's biggest pop star". In both side, ambition were enormous, as the company planned "to change the way popular tunes from major artists are released in the future", and the way Madonna was in charge of every detail; for instance, she refused to hold a Pepsi can in the commercial.

After her Pepsi commercial, for authors of Bitch She's Madonna (2018) she was a pioneer of creating musicality. Spanish cultural critic Víctor Lenore states that with this ad, she "opened the door to major endorsements of fashionable singers and multiplied the global impact of pop music". To Taraborrelli, none of the future Pepsi ads "would generate the excitement of Pepsi's failed deal with Madonna". Phil Dusenberry, however, said that one of the biggest two regrets of his career was casting Madonna for Pepsi.

Cultural and commercial trends 

In most part of her career, the relationship with Madonna and trends attracted commentaries from multiple observers, as Canadian author Ken McLeod confirmed that "she has played a part in several cultural trends". Art historian John A. Walker deemed her as an "acute observer of trends" in terrains from art to film. José Igor Prieto-Arranz from University of the Balearic Islands called her a "cultural product" itself and agent of cultural production. In this vein, professor Suzanna Danuta Walters commented that in academic writing, she was "understood" as a personification of commodity capitalism and for her capacity to "make human beings into objects for sale and circulation".

The rhetoric view in most part of her career, was that she usually "sets trends", with a general perception (during decades) that she was slightly "ahead of the curve". In this journey, she received the tag of being a "coolhunting". Scientist Jamie Anderson, one of the authors of The Fine Art of Success (2011), commented that she "is one of the world's first artists to bring this approach to the music industry". Historically and long before this term (coolhunting) entered in the mainstream marketing discourse, American author Rob Walker commented that she was "renowned for spotting new trends". On top with this, writer Popy Belasco virtually called the singer as the "first coolhunter in history". According to David Graham from Toronto Star, "Madonna's knack for cool hunting is legendary". During the height of her career in the 21st century, MuchMusic deemed the singer as "the world's top trend-maker".

Criticism came from observers like lecturer Susan Hopkins from University of Southern Queensland, whom said that Madonna "pioneered a lot of cultural trends that didn't do average working women a lot of favour". Timothi Jane Graham from American business magazine Success even said that "it was once rumored she actually paid cultural sleuths to keep her informed of every shift and modulation of the current trends before they made their way into the masses". After the release of her album Hard Candy many observers called that she followed trends, instead created them.

List of fad and trends "credited" to Madonna 
Nota bene: This section only includes illustrative examples. Other examples can be found in other sections of this article.

As Madonna has been reported or cited as a help or motivation for the rise, introduction or popularity of several things such as terms, places, cultural practices, fashion trends or products. Some illustrative credits of these fad and trends started or forwarded by the singer (or almost mostly by her), includes:

Within sector of tourism, Manuel Heredia, minister of tourism in Belize, discussed with El Heraldo de México how "La Isla Bonita" has helped to attract tourists to the San Pedro Town. A similar example occurred when she moved to Lisbon around 2017, and Portuguese or Spanish outlets credited her presence as a boost and help for the tourism industry within sectors such as "luxury tourism" or real estate business.

She played a major role in some ancient cultural practices to normalize them in the modern Western society. Numerous sources such as The Independent credited Madonna to popularise the Jewish mysticism in the Western world. American novelist and former educator Alison Strobel commented that "Madonna had popularized it to the point where it was simple to find a place to go learn". Her figure has been also important to the role for the Kabbalah in Occident; media analyst Mark Dice called her the "celebrity face" of this discipline. In 2002, author Eric Michael Mazur wrote that "she has almost single-handedly made American teenagers vaguely familiar with Hindu mantras and Jewish kabbalistic". The New York Times (NYT) contributors concluded she "brought" yoga to the masses. The same perception of NYT is shared by others, while professors Isabel Dyck and Pamela Moss particularly credited her the popularity of Ashtanga Yoga.

In idiomatic expressions, associate professor Diane Pecknold in American Icons (2006) noticed that she helped to popularize words and phrases in the English lexicon. Pecknold included the term "wannabe" used by Time magazine back in 1985 to describe the Madonna wannabe phenomenon. Another inclusion was the title of her first feature  film Desperately Seeking Susan which produced a new idiomatic phrase considering the newspaper headlines. Her position in the raise of idiomatic term fauxmosexual was noted by Kristin Lieb of BuzzFeed News whose remarked in 2018 that this phenomenon started with her kissing both Britney Spears and Christina Aguilera at the 2003 MTV Video Music Awards. The "Madonna-Britney influence" in this term was early mentioned by MedicineNet in 2004. People staff agreed that she "coined" the term for "Get rid of it".

The association with Madonna helped other businesses or people. The Madonna-Marilyn Monroe connection has been extensively discussed and largely thanks to Madonna, Monroe has become "the woman who will not die", as Gloria Steinem puts it, "an ever-present fixture in everyday American culture". The Daily Telegraph explained that the singer helped transform Frida Kahlo into a collector's darling. Another supporter of this view, is art historian John A. Walker whom said that partly due to Madonna, the artist became a posthumous celebrity not only in the domain of art history but also in popular culture. Mexican art magazine Artes de México staff notated in 1991, the importance of the singer for the "Fridomania". Author Juliana Tzvetkova wrote that Dolce & Gabbana "received their first international recognition thanks" to Madonna, while journalists like Lynn Hirschberg notated that the attention around fashion designer Olivier Theyskens was "intensified thanks to the singer". A similar situation occurred with Jean-Paul Gaultier as many people are familiar with his work via his collaboration with the singer.

Madonna's visibility in fashion also set numerous fads. But from a cultural sense, scholars Rhonda Hammer and Douglas Kellner felt that the phenomenon of femininity inspired by South Asia as a tendency in Western media could go back to February 1998 when Madonna released her video for "Frozen". They wrote that "although Madonna did not initiate the Indian fashion accessories beauty ... she did propel it into the public eye by attracting the attention of the worldwide media". Professors Christopher Partridge and Marcus Moberg have commented: "Since Madonna first put Indian cultural symbols on the global fashion map, henna, bindis and Indian sartorial designs have become part of the global popular culture reinforced by Bollywood's Western invasion". Authors go to further suggest that she ensured the Hindu invasion of Western popular musical space and made South Asian popular culture globally visible.

She was also suggested in popularize cultural appropriation by a Newsweek contributor. Madonna also was credited to take Goth fashion from underground to mainstream. She has carried the burlesque to mass culture according to Latin critics. In many ways, her documentary Madonna: Truth or Dare is viewed as a precursor of the TV reality concept.

Mass media responses and reception 

Rather than a singer, she is a global multimedia phenomenon in the perception of José Igor Prieto-Arranz from University of the Balearic Islands. For Tim Delaney, author of Connecting Sociology to Our Lives: An Introduction to Sociology (2015), "her perceived outrageous behavior in the 1980s and 1990s set the tone for public discourse and analysis". Professor Ann Cvetkovich remarked that figures such as Madonna, reveals the "global reach of media culture". In another consideration, British sociologist Ellis Cashmore proposed that more than anyone else, Madonna effected a change in style and the manner in which stars engaged with the media.

Madonna's public and media appearances, has generated a vast scholarly analysis. Authors in academic compendium The Madonna Connection (1993) confirmed this saying that "other scholars analyze media-Madonna discourses and representations". In the late-1980s, John Fiske, a media scholar and cultural theorist perceived her as a "site of meanings" for performance purposes, adding that "she is a rich terrain to explore". Various academics also noted a commentary from The Village Voice editor Steven Anderson on Madonna, whose said in 1989: "She's become a repository for all our ideas about fame, money, sex, feminism, pop culture, even death". In a retroactively view of this point, British reader Deborah Jermyn of Roehampton University commented in her book Female Celebrity and Ageing (2016) that Madonna "does age and rather than retire from view Madonna continues to function as a repository".

A scholar once points that because she has come to occupy such a large portion of public media attention, "Madonna functions rather like what environmentalist call a megafauna". In the perception of Spanish philosopher Ana Marta González, Madonna doesn't have a "cultural" prominence but proposes in her 2009 essay (Ficción e identidad. Ensayos de cultura postmoderna) that with her media appearances the singer "would be more culturally significant than most of the people who have changed the course of history". Media scholar David Tetzlaff said that her "omnipresent" appeal "has to do with hyperreality, but an infinite accumulation of simulacra, an overabundance of information". More than two decades later, music writer and teacher T. Cole Rachel writing for Pitchfork in 2015 commented that "if you aren't a super fan—or even a fan at all—there's no escaping Madonna. She is everywhere". In addition to having been perceived as "omnipresent" by different outlets and for different reasons, other sources felt that beyond music industry she is one of the most "recognizable names in the world".

Relationship with critics and the press 

Madonna's relationship with the critics is a "well-established" and "crucial aspect" of her career. In many ways, this treatment played a major role beyond Madonna's own figure. In 1985 for instance, Australian newspaper The Canberra Times quickly attributed to Madonna in "nearly reversed the typical pattern of rock idol analysis". Almost 30 years later, Madonna's widespread influence on female artists and the impact she have had in their literature was noted by a contributor from Vice whom said: "Reviews of her work have served as a roadmap for scrutinizing women at each stage in their music career".

The academic relationship of Madonna is also far reaching. At first instance, Caroline von Lowtzow from Süddeutsche Zeitung reminds that interpreting Madonna has never been only a domain of tabloid media. A group of reviewers like Annalee Newitz talked about her intellectual audience, and an author from Bimonthly Review of Law Books called it a "little subindustry of intellectuals" when answering the question "Why do intellectuals talk about Madonna?". Author also concludes on this, because "everybody talks about Madonna". In terms of influence, Dutch media scholar Jaap Kooijman commented that before the Madonna studies, "most scholarly attention was paid to genres and artists that were not considered 'pop'", but she brought 'pop' to the foreground. Before Madonna, authors in The Madonna Connection (1993) remarked that academics were typically the last to know about popular phenomena (or they willfully ignore them), but their reaction to Madonna has proved to be an exception to the rule.

From one foundational motivation as the figure she attained among reviewers, Billboard staff commented in 1989, that "Madonna has always stayed one step ahead our expectations: in music, in fashion, in outright audaciousness". In fact, American academic and journalist J. Hoberman, has concurred saying: "She even directs her critics, the millions of sociologists, psychologists, and students of semiotics who have made her the world's biggest pop start". In the following description, numerous authors have commented their continuing interest in the figure of Madonna. As Taraborelli, said about keep writing about her in his updated version of Madonna: An Intimate Biography in 2018: "I have never stopped writing about Madonna since that day I first met her thirty-five years ago". Years prior, in 2008, Argentine writer Rodrigo Fresán expressed a similar feeling: "And the years go by and life changes but something remains constant: one continues to write about Madonna".

In this cross-reference relation of Madonna-critics, Sheila Jeffreys said that postmodern theorists of cultural studies elevated Madonna to cult status. Other group of authors focused in the mixed response she has had, as American psychologist and educator Francine Shapiro explained that many critics and fans "love to hate" her. In the words of Audra Gaugler from Lehigh University "there exists a large band of critics that at first praised her, but then became disillusioned with her as she became more and more controversial".

Interested in her social impact, Tetzlaff decided to study the relationship between the press and Madonna. Barbara O'Dair compiled and related her relationship with Rolling Stone magazine in a book called Madonna, the Rolling stone files (1997) and said that she always has been an "enigma". In Profiles of Female Genius (1994), author Gene N. Landrum said: "The press has in turn made Madonna the most visible, photographed, and debated female in modern times". For professor Suzanna Danuta Walters "accompanying Madonna's own elaboration of superstardom has been a sustained effort —by the mass media and academics alike— to continually produce and reproduce this cultural icon".

Sociologist Cashmore, states that the singer exploited the expansion of media opportunities, inciting journalists with one scandal after another, so that she became almost impossible to ignore. Journalists were constantly on-guard. He also commented: "Madonna wanted —and got— more saturation media coverage than anyone, present and past". HuffPost editor Matthew Jacobs, said that "without the 21st century's ever-rapid news cycle, the volume of media attention Madonna commanded was a feat. Only Michael Jackson rivaled her".

Public and media "manipulation" 

She has elicited a number of public perceptions regarding her personality and media manipulation during a part of her career. With the advent of her album Like a Prayer, American journalist Josh Tyrangiel commented that she reached her peak as a "media manipulator". Music critic J. D. Considine asserted that Madonna was "more media manipulator than musician". Rock and Roll Hall of Fame described that "no one in the pop realm has manipulated the media with such a savvy sense of self-promotion".

Music critic Stephen Thomas Erlewine wrote for her profile in Allmusic and MTV that "one of Madonna's greatest achievements is how she has manipulated the media and the public with her music, her videos, her publicity, and her sexuality". Becky Johnston from Interview magazine commented: "[F]ew public figures are such wizards at manipulating the press and cultivating publicity as Madonna is. She has always been a great tease with journalists, brash and outspoken when the occasion demanded it".

Professor John Izod in Myth, Mind and the Screen: Understanding the Heroes of Our Time (2001) described that "when we categorise Madonna's public personality in terms recognised in analytical psychology, we find it belongs to two large classes of archetypal images". The first is she projects herself as a type of goddess and the second is the trickster. In more approaches political activist, Jasmina Tešanović called Madonna as "one of the most honest performers in pop culture" and further asserted that her changes "are well-calculated". In 2013, lecturer Becca Cragin said that "Madonna has managed to hold the public's attention for 30 years" with skills such as "expressing herself".

Magazines and others outlets

MTV 

As is cited that MTV helped her, some writers like Mark Bego stated that Madonna helped make MTV (sometimes overrides any other artist). However, for biographer Chris Dicker she transcended her "MTV persona". Similarly, Chilean literary critic Óscar Contardo states MTV as the newness doesn't exist anymore but Madonna does. For authors like Arie Kaplan, "she was the first artist to really use MTV to establish her popularity".

Overall, the symbiosis of Madonna-MTV has been largely documented and analyzed, as well Madonna's singular position in their history. Editor Carrie Havranek, explained that during the early days of the channel, "quite simply there was no one else like her". When she entered in her sixties, Matthew Jacobs called her "the first pop star of the MTV era to remain prolific at 60".

A consideration of her singular status within channel's history came from Rolling Stone staff that include editors Bilge Ebiri and Maura Johnston among others, as they wrote that "Madonna's music videos defined the MTV era and changed pop culture forever", as well "no artist conquered the medium like the Queen of Pop". Writing for The New York Times, Jim Farber said that "Madonna's clips have given the network more media headlines than any other artist" and also said that she gave MTV Video Music Awards their defining tone at their inaugural ceremony in 1984. The channel played her music videos more than any other artist's, and "La Isla Bonita" became the most requested video in the channel history by a record-breaking 20 consecutive weeks. Also, she was a regular presence at the MTV awards.

Philanthropy and activism 

Her public perception, attached with her self-work include her role as a celebrity philanthropy. Madonna's philanthropic endeavors, include her own organizations Ray of Light Foundation (e. 1998) and Raising Malawi (e. 2008). She set various records and was awarded for her philanthropic and humanitarian endeavors. She became the largest individual philanthropist in Malawi. According to Global Philanthropy Group, she is the largest individual donor to the hospital and funds programs run by Eric Borgstein at Queen Elizabeth Central Hospital. She is also at the top of the a long list of celebrities who have supported the Kabbalah Centre in Los Angeles.

Early in her career, she became one of the first activists for HIV/AIDS epidemic. She had friendship with many HIV-positive people, for which she dedicated them the song "In This Life" in Erotica. According to Rolling Stone her contributions to the AIDS causes was relatively overlooked by her marriage with Sean Penn. They recognized that she became "the first major American pop star to stage such a large-scale fund-raiser". She donated money from various of her concerts for the cause, including outside the States, like she did in Paris, France in 1987 to the French Association of Artists Against AIDS during the Who's That Girl World Tour. Madonna continued in the rest of her career, into the advocacy of AIDS awareness.

She also promoted safe sex, especially in her concerts to "remember the dead, and affirm the living". In a 1988 campaign, she told schoolkids: "Avoid casual sex and you'll avoid AIDS. And stay away from people who shoot drugs". American professor and critic, Louis Menand calls her "a leading spokesperson for safe sex".

Madonna partook of the most money raised by a birthday fundraiser (Elizabeth Taylor's 65th birthday, 1997), recognized by the Guinness World Records (1999). Madonna attended to numerous benefit concerts, including being part of the largest environmental fundraising event recognized by the Guinness World Records, a 1998 concert for Rainforest Foundation Fund. She performed at Live Aid (1985), Live 8 (2005) and Live Earth (2007). Madonna is indeed, the only artist to performed at these three events according to E!, as well she is one of only eight acts —and the only female artist— to have been a headlining performer at both 1985's Live Aid and 2005's Live 8.

Religious themes

Fame 
Biographer Mark Bego among others, have seen Madonna more a star rather than a public performer, singer or actress. Meanwhile, Robert Christgau wrote that "celebrity is her true art".

American professor Gail Dines stated that understanding Madonna's popularity also requires focus on audiences, not just as individuals but as members of specific groups. In this line, Professor Abby J Stewart, one of the contributors of Women Creating Lives (1994) confirmed that popularity commenting that "crosses lines of gender, race, class, and perhaps most curious, education".

Timeline 
Her reputation of popularity was seen different from the view of multiple authors, decades and cultural differences. In her decade debut, however, it saw a generally agreement about her status. For instance, Stan Hawkins from University of Leeds said that Madonna was the first female solo artist to gain superstar status in the 1980s. Historian Gil Troy confirmed the singer as "the 1980's dominant female star", while Arie Kaplan, called her the most powerful female pop icon of the decade. Across the century, for authors like Hawkins she emerged as a central female icon of the twentieth century.

Back to the 1990s, her stardom declined in the views of American authors like academic Lynn Spigel, while Andrew Ferguson suggested that her "real crime" had been longevity. Overseas British author Mark Watts writing for New Theatre Quarterly in 1996, summarized that the "rise and (perceived) decline of Madonna has gone, so to say, hand-in-hand with that of postmodern theory — but none the less pervasively influential for that". Many years after, a similar feeling was shared by sociologist Cashmore, in 2018, when notated that "thereafter, her presence might have faded, but her influence remained". In summary and despite divided perceptions, Christgau wrote that her fame is so far-reaching that it is difficult even to measure.

Responses and cultural effect 

In an intellectual reaction about her fame, Annalee Newitz noticed in the early-1990s that the "fields of theology to queer studies have written literally volumes about what Madonna's stardom means for gender relations, for American culture and for the future". Senior academic administrator MaryAnn Janosik praised the singer because said that emerged as self-made star, proving that "power is accessible to all, including women". Following this, American Photo held in 1995, that "more than anyone else, Madonna challenged the terms of celebrity for women".

Talking about Madonna's own impact, music editor Bill Friskics-Warren wrote that singer's "megastardom and cultural ubiquity had made her as much a social construct" and a "person-turned-idea". At some point of her career, Madonna's celebrity ambiguity was then unusual but was explained by American author Maureen Orth in the following way: "Madonna's celebrity is unique in that it seems to depend as much on repugnance as on acceptance. Her fame frame, unlike that of most other mega-stars, rests very much on people who love to hate her—while monitoring her every move—and on others who hate to love her".

A group of authors agreed in Madonna's fame to establish a template for pop stars of next generations. For example, Erin Skarda wrote for Time in 2012 that "she essentially redefined what it meant to be famous in America". T. Cole Rachel from Pitchfork Media explained that "she devised the archetype of pop stardom as we know and understand it today". British author Peter Robinson also proposes that "Madonna pretty much invented contemporary pop fame so there is a little bit of her in the DNA of every modern pop thing". Also, Elysa Gardner of USA Today expressed that "no single artist has been more crucial in shaping our modern view of celebrities as people who need people — and attention". Barbara Ellen from The Observer gave a greater importance to the singer, as she said that "arguably, Madonna has transcended pop stardom to become the first great reality show".

Another group of authors agreed that she "helped to redefine the nature of [a] celebrity". Indeed, her contributions to the celebrity culture was noted by art historian John A. Walker who said that "Madonna's celebrity tactics are now everywhere". A similar suggestion was shared by Cashmore, whose recognized that although she "didn't singlehandedly start celebrity culture", concludes that "since Madonna's Like a Virgin video, scandal has become something of a holy grail for celebrities". Furthermore, Guilbert wrote that "some celebrities seeking publicity do not hesitate to use Madonna's name" as well other cited "to become as famous as Madonna" like Celine Dion did in her early career.

Madonna as the most famous woman in the world (and others similar titles) 

Madonna has been slightly described as "the most famous woman" by numerous publications during five consecutive decades (1980s—2020s). In 2019, American journalist Vanessa Grigoriadis commented: "The conventional wisdom is that Madonna became more famous than everyone else because she was dying to become famous". Sal Cinquemani from Slant reviewed her then 20-years-old career in 2003, saying that in the vein of "Live to Tell", the song "seems to sum up everything Madonna has tried to tell us about being 'the most famous woman in the world'".

The tag of being "the most famous woman in the world" has been commented by numerous academics and observers. Associate professor Diane Pecknold felt that the claim to distinction her as "the world's most famous woman" seems to require no defense. Frances Negrón-Muntaner citing Rolling Stone observed that she has been labeled the most famous woman alive "who has imprinted, one way or another, not only a generation but the world". French academic Guilbert documented that "in the American, British, Australian and French press" (his four principal sources) "it is generally taken for granted that Madonna is the most famous female in the world".

In similar approaches, British scholar and economist Robert M. Grant described her as "the best known woman on the planet" in a class about her in 2008, and for Bryant Gumbel was "the most famous woman in the entertainment business". Similar perceptions were provided by a large group of authors. For instance, in 2007 political advisor Aaron Klein observed that she is probably "the most well-known American celebrity in the Middle East". When she was living in the United Kingdom, BBC reporter Rosie Millard described her as "arguably the most famous persona currently residing in the UK". Similarly, British journalist Dylan Jones proclaimed in a 2001 article for The Independent: "Madonna: the most famous woman in the world interviewed".

British author Matt Cain summarized in 2018: "She's one of the most famous women ever to have lived". Overall, lecturer Ron Moy at Liverpool John Moores University wrote in Kate Bush and Hounds of Love (2013) that her "notoriety, performances and songs have rendered her one of the most recognisable human beings on the planet". Kellner named her "the most popular woman entertainer of her era (and perhaps of all time)".

Within the Internet culture, she also attained similar status through some rankings. For instance and according to Orlando Sentinel, Cornell University ranked Madonna in 2014 as the "most influential woman in history" based in a study of Wikipedia algorithms. In 2017, ThoughtCo placed her at first in their "Top 100 Women in History", calling Madonna "the number one woman of history searched for year after year on the Net". Similarly, Time ranked her at third —highest-ranked woman— in their list of "The 100 Most Obsessed-Over People on the Web", only behind George W. Bush and Barack Obama. In an International Federation of the Phonographic Industry (IFPI) report from 2001, research showed Madonna as the most pirated artist.

Over the course of her career, she has been identified with similar appellatives of "the first", "the greatest", "the biggest" or "the most". For instance, at one time of her career, she was named the "most photographed woman in the world" by a varied of sources, like British Journal of Photography (2006). In 2017, Louis Virtel of Uproxx called Madonna "the greatest celebrity of all time". In Madonna, Andrew Morton described her as "the most wanted woman in the world". Financial adviser Alvin Hall placed the singer in 2003 as the "world's most powerful celebrity" at that time. Dutch academic Anne-Marie Korte from Utrecht University called her "America's greatest female pop star ever". American writer, Merle Ginsberg said she is perhaps "the biggest star who ever lived". In contrast, it was suggested only Madonna's inability to conquer movies has kept her from being acknowledged as "the greatest entertainment phenomenon ever".

Image, gender, identity and appearance 

Madonna is credited by critics and audience alike with developing and managing her own image. Indeed, she is typified as the first female artist to manage this practice or more than anyone else before, as feminist theorists such as Sonya Andermahr of University of Northampton held that the singer "exercises more power and control over the production, marketing and financial value of her image than any female icon before her". A number of writers have stressed the importance of the visual to Madonna and one has described her career as a "succession of images". According to Matthew Rettenmund, "her visuals have always been at least as important to her legacy", as Fouz-Hernández explained that the control of her projects and image is "legendary".

The focus that authors have given to this practice by Madonna is vast. Like Ohio State University said that her image became the source of endless debate among feminists and cultural scholars. Lecturer John Street from University of East Anglia noticed a singular feature in the attention surrounding her, as her reception for both critics and defenders "it is devoted almost exclusively to her image and appearance". Musicologist Susan McClary pondered that "great deal of ink has been spilled in the debate over Madonna's visual image". British professor and linguist Sara Mills in her book Gendering the Reader (1994) noted that "academic writing on Madonna has seen her as innovative largely in her use of images, and has concentrated overwhelmingly on her video work".

For sources like Melody Maker her success even radicate in her image. Their explanation ran like this: "The secret, of course, isn't in the music... Madonna is the most popular female singer of all time and she is pure image". Dr. Susan Hopkins said that she "is the quintessential image strategist". Kanye West, concludes: "Madonna, I think, is the greatest visual musical artist that we've ever had".

From the start of her career, she was willing to turn her identity into a concept. In the point of view of Lynne Layton, a clinical professor of psychology at Harvard Medical School she is "popular because she reflects our own uncertainties about identity". Many authors have used the analogy of her "Who's That Girl"? era in terms of her identity. Layton for example, said that she contributed to this myth by letting Madonna control her title of the book Who's That Girl? Who's That Boy?: Clinical Practice Meets Postmodern Gender Theory (2013).

Also, authors of Madonna's Drowned World explained that "much has been written about Madonna's subversion, deconstruction and inversion of gender". Gender theorist Judith Butler explained that the singer embodied multiple identities at once. This usage of her own identity was praised by American journalist Wesley Morris, whose defined her as "the first great identity artist", saying that "Madonna treated the genders and other people's identities as fashion, she made those identities seem fashionable". Indeed, authors Peggy Phelan and Lynda Hart have concurred that "more than almost any other artist whose identity seems patently intelligible, she has provoked immense pleasure in her fans by courting their identities as a component of her own".

In doing so, she also introduced a concept of celebrity beauty, that was "more fluid and mobile" and perhaps marked "the beginning of new era in celebrity beauty". Indeed, Camille Paglia suggested that "Madonna's most enduring cultural contribution may be that she has introduced ravishing visual beauty and a lush Mediterranean sensuality". Also, American critic Ty Burr emphasizes that she was the first postmodern female celebrity in that she considered "authenticity" to be just one more mask to put on in a grand game of celebrity dress.

Finding another cultural meaning, professor John Izod said that "Madonna's image is a centre of energy around which ideas, images, affects and myths cohere" but also conclude that "accepting that Madonna's image does function to give body to the cultural unconscious, the shape-shifting characteristic of her work carries with it the risk that her image may jump cultural boundaries that not all her fans are capable of crossing". American editor Annalee Newitz stated that the singer has given to American culture, and culture throughout the world, "is not a collection of songs; rather, it is a collection of images".

Madonna's physicality 

Christopher Flynn, her dance instructor was one of the first people to notice her qualities and appearance. Madonna commented that he taught her to appreciate beauty, not in the conventional sense, but "rather beauty of the spirit". He described Madonna to have an ancient-looking face, "a face like an ancient Roman statue" and then later Flynn said that "it's not physical beauty, it's something deeper". Richard Maschal from The Charlotte Observer interviewed Madonna at 19, during July 1978 when she was a dance student, and also noticed her beauty saying: "I really did think she looked like a madonna and so was amazed when I asked her name and she gave it" further adding that "she resembled a literal Renaissance madonna". Freddy DeMann recalls from their first meetings: "She had the most unbelievable physicality I've ever seen in any human".

Re-invention 

Madonna has been also noted for her continual change of images and style. Known also as "reinvention", this is a word constantly attributed in her career according to biographer Michelle Morgan. She even called a tour the Re-Invention World Tour. As reviews about reinvention has been a constant, Maria Wikse, a Swedish author emphasizes that "most critics recognise" her reinvention and "how it influences the way in which we read her texts". Lynne Layton of Harvard University has concurred that "this is one of Madonna's cultural meanings". Author K. Elan Jung, elevated this saying "she displayed an almost unique capacity for reinvention, it it's actually her most distinctive characteristic". Ludovic Hunter-Tilney from Financial Times summarized an effect in her career with this matters, saying that "her image changes have launched countless fads and fuelled a boom in jargon-filled academic studies about her as a post-feminist chameleon".

Historically, David Bowie is frequently credited as a precursor in music terms. Australian scholar McKenzie Wark assured that alongside him both "raised this to a fine art". While Madonna is not the first artist to reinvent herself, a group of authors have elevated Madonna from a nearly "unique" position, either as a female figure or regardless gender. At first instance, writer Matt Cain said that "she popularized reinvention" arguing that she led to it becoming part of the strategic repertoire of every star since. From a female perspective, both value and position of Madonna's reinvention was exemplified by authors of Queer Style (2013), the New Zealand fashion academic Vicki Karaminas and Australian lecturer Adam Geczy, as they wrote that she "transmogrified from virgin to dominatrix to Über Fran, each time achieving iconic status", asserting that Madonna is "the first woman to do so-and with mainstream panache and approbation". In other words, and following Karaminas and Geczy's description, Madonna linked patterns that were previously seen as incompatible: Religion and sexuality, heterosexuality and homosexuality, subculture and mainstream.

A popular view in most part of her career, was summarized by Roger Ebert as he notes that pop sociologists have claimed that "she changes images so quickly that she is always ahead of her audience". In context with Ebert's thoughts, Chris Rojek of Brunel University explained that in the decades of the 1980s and 1990s, that frequency of image changes that she made produced that "no-one could guess what she would do next or pin down her essential self". Alongside her reinventions, The New Zealand Herald staff explained that "she was the master of the unexpected". American journalist Chris Smith added another significance and wrote in 101 Albums That Changed Popular Music (2007) that she "manipulated her image beyond the limits of music's traditional media, and in doing so extended her reach as a musical artist to that of near-legendary cultural phenomenon".

Similar to Cain's claims, John Intini from Canadian magazine Maclean's pointed out: "The art of reinvention—of which Madonna is queen—has saved many musical careers". Erica Russell from the MTV staff, also noticed this Madonna's legacy concept of reinvention in other musicians. She states that "have left a lasting mark on the culture of pop music, normalizing it for artists to reinvent their image, sound, and creative themes upon each new 'era' or album release".

On a broader scale, the singer "is credited with popularizing the view that identity is not fixed and can be continuously rearranged and revamped" according to British sociologist David Gauntlett. Author Lisa Taylor similarly argued that her continual change of image "promoted the idea that female identity was a construct that could be orchestrated and manipulated at will". In the perspective of self-help and business discourses, Madonna's reinvention case has also been discussed in large proportions. For British management consultant Richard Koch among other business theorists, Madonna's primary achievement was to reinvent herself and contributed to build her myth. In connection with this, it was written in Dissertation Abstracts International: The humanities and social sciences. A (2008), that "Madonna's pattern of reinvention follows larger models of reinvention applied to commercial products". In summary, life coach Jackee Holder mentioned "reinvention is the modern-day career move" and "Madonna is the modern-day example of reinvention".

Lifestyle and health 

According to the Ohio State University her lifestyle has been discussed more than her music. The Observer columnist Barbara Ellen commented that "Madonna's life has always been much more vigorously reviewed than her art" and "much of her personal history has now passed into legend". Overall, Rolling Stone staff commented that "her personal life is tracked, scrutinized and documented as a matter of course".

A multitude of agents from journalists to academics, have reviewed the likeness of her work with elements of her life. Layton suggested that "Madonna makes sense of her life. By deliberately making her life a part of her work. Madonna presents us with both a public and a private persona". While this was not central only with Madonna, British sociologist Ellis Cashmore praised her legacy on this, saying that "after Madonna, any aspiring singer or actor knew that they would have to surrender what used to be called a private life to their public".

Named a fitness icon, Madonna co-founded a chain of fitness centers called Hard Candy Fitness. She was part of event Sport Aid's Race Against Time in 1988 and she was one of the first stars to become devotee to Pilates.

According to Canadian author Ken McLeod "she promoted a body image shaped by dance and exercise" noting further that her "attention to fitness and exercise is legendary". Perhaps, one of this examples include the relationship she had with artist Jean-Michel Basquiat, as she ended their love affair because of his heroin addiction. Art historian John A. Walker noted that she was an early riser, ate healthy food, took exercise, and disdained drugs, unlike Basquiat. However, in 2014, Madonna admitted that she has experimented with drugs. "I tried everything once, but as soon as I was high, I spent my time drinking tons of water to get it out of my system", she said. In 2016, Madonna told James Corden at his Carpool Karaoke: "My work is rebellious, but my lifestyle isn't rebellious. I don't smoke, I don't drink, I don't party. I'm quite square".

Her health condition and body image has been scrutinized, and to extent, various observers have found a significance of this for her persona, work and beyond her own figure. At first instance, in the essence of her career, Caryn Ganz from The New York Times commented that "her fitness, flexibility and strength have always been tied to the kind of cultural power she wields". British journalist Bidisha has made a similar observation saying that "it is impossible to talk about Madonna without talking about power", she is an athlete. For Bidisha, "her muscularity is not about appearance; it is an indication of her mental strength and resilience".

As this impact transcended Madonna's own figure, Ganz also summarized that the singer "was a pioneer of welding her voice to her image, and in a culture consumed with critiquing how women look, and controlling how they use their bodies". Professor Suzanna Danuta Walters, in Material Girls: Making Sense of Feminist Cultural Theory (1995) wrote that "the figure of Madonna is emblematic of the consumed way women are represented in popular culture". To McLeod, "Madonna's videos and live shows introduced a new physicality into female pop performance". Similarly, music critic Patricia Godes said that "Madonna was the first white Caucasian celebrity to have an athletic physique, with muscular legs, with shoulders instead of the style that was previously worn by skinny women. It changed a little the idea of female physique". An author quoted that Madonna made the "female body seem more like a machine with cravings".

Richard Sine from medical site WebMD confirmed that health experts have commented Madonna's well-being and added that "without ever speaking a word on the subject, Madonna may have done more to spur the world's collective fitness than anyone else". In Sine's view, her singles have been the backdrop "an untold number of aerobics classes and treadmill sessions, not to mention dance-floor workouts".

Ambition and personality 

Various reviewers have largely documented her ambition, work ethic and personality, and the likeness of these things with her work or how she is perceived by the audience. In her literature, a varied of agents have analogy used her title of "blonde ambition", while for American journalist Vanessa Grigoriadis is something that "what set her apart". For business analyst like, Roger Blackwell, Madonna's ambition is a common denominator in their marketing analysis. Blackwell, commented that she "has thrived primarily due to her raw ambition rather than raw talent".

Mostly in her early career, diverse personalities (from dancer teachers to music executives and photographers) that had encounters with Madonna recognized her as "being unique". One of them, was Pearl Lang. Alongside this perception, American author Rene Denfeld said that Madonna is one of the first female public figures ever to present ambition, power and strength into one empowering package. A contributor from company Spin Media concluded that "Madonna has changed society through her fiery ambition". Metaphorically, columnist Gail Walker of Belfast Telegraph opined that "when people use the word 'attitude', it's because Madonna invented it".

According to German cultural critic Diedrich Diederichsen, Madonna "herself openly cultivated the legend of her ambition, which would stop at nothing". Following this, Madonna told writer Matthew Todd her ambition was driven by feeling unloved after the death of her mother. To professor Lisa N. Peñaloza, Madonna ambition is "legendary" and reminds that the singer has been quoted as waiting to equal God in fame. As author Kay Turner, have commented that the singer "made outrageous claims about her ambitions, but invited the world to join her in believing that". In January 1984, Madonna told Dick Clark on the TV talent show American Bandstand that she wanted "to rule the world". Mary Cross commented about this: "At least in the world of pop music, that was going to happen sooner than anyone thought".

Madonna is considered "one of the hardest working and most disciplined of performers". Other outlets like The Straits Times, actually suggested that she is arguably "the hardest-work-ing woman in the music business". She is also noted for being tagged as workaholic and perfectionist. An author described that she is "obsessively controlling of all the things she does". Charles Andrew Gallagher a La Salle University professor, said that Madonna never lets her audience forget that whatever "look" she acquires is attained by hard work. Within the Freudian's psychic energy theory, she was described as a "prototypical example of a life-force" and a "prototypical model for excessive".

In ambiguous views, during part of her career she was accused for using men to help launch her to fame. Also, she repeatedly used and discarded disc jockeys, directors, managers (of both sexes), friends, producers and whoever could help advance her career in her "dizzying" ascent from the bottom to the top. Her response to these charges was, "Ail those men I stepped all over to get to the top—every one of them would take me back because they still love me and I still love them".  Also, J. Hoberman commented that "to criticize Madonna for her narcissism is to complain that water is wet". Mary Cross suggested "Madonna is demanding, but given her own perfectionism and discipline, she expects a lot from her entourage".

Writer Laura Barcella, states "what's always been most powerful about Madonna is her smarts". Barcella, remarked as well her IQ of 140, which makes her a "genius certified" (or with other measurements, a near genius-level). Providing a religious point of view, British Anglican and academic, Emma Ineson explored the ambition, success and power of Jesus and concluded in her case "Madonna's biggest fear is mediocrity". For cultural critic Saul Austerlitz, she "engaged in a one upmanship contest with herself".

Ageing 

Various commentators observed the impact of ageism in Madonna's career and how this have defined her own image. Music writer T. Cole Rachel of Pitchfork, explained that as "she gets older she becomes polarizing in new ways". She is also "the site of both critical debate and academic study, much of which perpetuates its own form of ageism". An author summarized that the singer has become the subject of "frequent derision" in the press where she is positioned as an ageing figure who performs sexuality beyond the "age of appropriacy". Nevertheless, another group have seen and given Madonna an almost unique position as a source of this debate. As author Sophie Fuller recalls that she is perhaps "the best known and most talked about female musician in her fifties". Authors of Human Aspects of IT for the Aged Population (2021), deemed the singer as an "interesting case of study because her artistic brand has always expressed a sexual nature".

In perspective, Madonna has suffered of ageism from the very start of her career according to Matt Cain. A similar comment was provided by T. Cole Rachel, who remarked: "People have been asking her about 'aging gracefully' since she entered her thirties" and in particular, author viewed a Madonna at age 57 with "media outlets talk[ing] about her as if she was 97". At age of 34, in 1992, Madonna asked in an interview with Jonathan Ross: "Is there a rule? Are people just supposed to die when they're 40?". Gail Walker of Belfast Telegraph opined that at this age, of 40, "was supposed to be the end of her creativity and influence". Overall, the public have been largely ambivalent towards Madonna's 50s and 60, as in the late-2000s, she "oscillates between agelessness and ageing".

From an ageism point of view, since 2008, many authors argued that Madonna became self-referential, obsessed with her own biography in a way that "leaped past confessionalism" and also hiring younger artists. In 2015, during the release of Rebel Heart, Diplo commented about status of Madonna's career and her poor reception (mainly suggested by ageism), reminding that "she created the world we live in". By contrast, American writer Michael Arceneaux suggested that it's not that she's "too old" adding that "the world [she] created has changed" and concluded that "part of being the premiere pop star is being ahead of the curve" and she has not been for a long time. American author Anne Helen Petersen questioned if is Madonna battling ageism—or battling for her own particular body to remain forever young?. Canadian author Ken McLeod commented that Madonna appears to be "at pains to be able to maintain the same fitness and ideal body image", as well "to some extent she may be viewed as something of a prisoner of her own constructed image".

On the other hand, Spanish writer Roy Galán warned that there exists a group of people on Internet dedicated to denigrate Madonna because her age, downgrading all her opinions and work. With the Internet culture, "Madonna naysayers had a bigger platform than ever", said Matthew Jacobs from HuffPost. In defense of the singer, Rosa Lagarrigue, an artistic manager commented that "who attack from social networks are ignorant cowards" and questioned: "No human being is equal at 20, 30 and 50, why do we demand that of Madonna?". Music critic Patricia Godes criticized those sexist comments on Madonna when people congratulated older male musicians such as Mick Jagger or Bob Dylan because their age and longevity; this led Godes to conclude "what is transgressive is being Madonna".

Indeed, comparisons with other celebrities have been a constant by other group of critics, including Cain whom suggested that "perhaps tellingly, Madonna is the only one to have survived". He commented that the singer succeed until 1983, at age 25 unlike Britney Spears or Beyoncé who were teenagers when they became famous or Madonna's fellow in the 1980s: Michael Jackson, Whitney Houston, Prince and George Michael, who were all much younger than her when they first enjoyed success. Another supporter of this view, Jacobs commented in 2019, that "Madonna maintained her throne longer than anyone else from any era". However, Jacobs also suggested that many of these artists, more or less accepted that they are nostalgia acts, and is a status "Madonna is hellbent on avoiding".

Australian magazine The Music asked "if the achievements of a privileged white woman like Madonna are devalued (referring to ageism), what does that mean for others?". Similar feelings and questions have been made by other outlets, and Jacobs laments that "That's the great tragedy of Madonna's late career. She wrote the playbook time and again, and she won't be alive to see the world acknowledge it".

Despite she divided opinions about ageism, is considered by many that she helped to introduce the "age inclusivity in pop". Around the time she turned 50, her tenacity had little precedent. Reviewing a Madonna at 60s, to Caryn Ganz of The New York Times, "there has never been a pop star writing and performing at her level, and demanding a seat at the table, at her age". Walker also commented: "The people who don't like Madonna had better get used to it, because we're living in a society now that's less about Madonna's age and more about the Age of Madonna". Writers from Bidisha to Cain, praised her because "she's dared to grow old and outlived many of her contemporaries".

Madonna's influence on other performers

Influences for Madonna 

The National Geographic Society found that historians or anthropologists trace "her influences" from several cultural inspirations such as the Middle Eastern spirituality to feminist art history. She has been also inspired by other performers and celebrities, while some biographers suggested that her main inspirations came from the world of arts and cinema, instead music. Indeed, she is often inspired by the visual artists she collects, and at some point of her career, Madonna claimed that "every video I've done has been inspired by some painting or work of art".

Observers commented the influence she had from other performers with Howard Kramer, curatorial director of the Rock and Roll Hall of Fame and Museum saying that "although Madonna had her influences, she created her own unmistakable style". He also added that the singer "wrote her own ticket; she didn't have to follow anybody's formula".

Madonna's influence on others 

Madonna's influence on others performers is a well-articulated theme, as a large number of international authors and music journalists have scrutinized it. Aside commentaries from critics, array female artists acknowledge the important influence of Madonna on their own careers. Overall, Guilbert wrote that "the press never stops comparing female singers to Madonna". Dutch academics also found that female artists "are very often measured against the yardstick that Madonna has become".

Gillian Branstetter writing for The Daily Dot felt that the singer "is scattered through every major act" and her influence is "almost smothering in its totality". Reviewing her then 20-year career in 2003, Ian Youngs from BBC wrote that "her influence on others has come as much from her image as her music". Both Youngs and Paul Rees from Q noted that Madonna "is aware of the influence she has" on others. British sociologist David Gauntlett studied the influence of Madonna on other performers and presented four key themes that she established as central, and that have since been used and emphasized by her successors (and imitators).

Authors like Branstetter are aware in the influence of other contemporaries artists beyond Madonna in the musical landscape. However, her singular position was explained by i-D contributor Nick Levine whom explained that "she didn't set the template alone" but further adds that "more than anyone else, Madonna created the rules of engagement now followed by everyone". Similarly, in 2018 Billboard staff compared her to fellows such as Michael Jackson and Prince but they remarked that "Madonna is still the one who most set the template for what a pop star could and should be".

Observers like Ann Powers to outlets such la Repubblica have called and lumped many of these musicians as "the heirs of Madonna" or her "musical daughters". On this point, Gauntlett commented that "many of them are Madonna's daughters in the very direct sense that they grew up listening to and admiring Madonna, and decided they wanted to be like her. Most of them have said so explicitly at some point". That treatment have generated the creation of listicles from diverse sources, including a 2013 ranking by MTV Latin American with the intention to find her "heir". MTV's Madeline Roth made the rank of "princesses of pop who have earned Madonna's blessing [The Queen of Pop]" adding that she "has voiced her disapproval for pitting women against each other".

Specifically with the popular music, she established a matriarchy in the pop scene. A varied authors like music journalist Diego A. Manrique whom wrote for the Portuguese version of El País commented the dominance on record charts of her "heirs", saying that in terms of popular culture we are living in a "Madonna era". British music journalist David Hepworth is another author who noticed it and states that "most of the biggest of the pop music" are women and Madonna "is the person who proved that this was possible, who opened up a new world for them to grow into". Like Manrique or Hepworht, Branstetter shared similar thoughts and found a greater significance commenting that one of the "biggest factors in this influence" is the context in which Madonna thrived when she appeared in the 1980s where "the vast majority of the top artists in the world were men".

In 2010, Michelle Castillo from Time summarized that "every pop star (of the past two or three decades) has Madonna to thank in some part for his or her success". Similar thoughts came from Mary Cross whose wrote that "new pop icons owe Madonna a debt of thanks" adding that her "influence is undeniable and far reaching". In a larger overview, Tony Sclafani writing for MSNBC in 2008 explained what he calls Madonna's impact and effect on the future direction of music after she emerged saying that "artists still use her ideas and seem modern and edgy doing so".

Outside the entertainment industry 
Outside the music industry, Madonna has been the subject of numerous books, essays and other literary works while more than a writer cited her as an influence. Editor Maura Johnston gave a context of this point saying that "the appetite for books on Madonna is large, and the variety of approaches writers, editors, and photographers have taken to craft their portraits is a testament to how her career has both inspired and provoked". Examples include Italian writer Francesco Falconi whose reported that she inspired his writing career. Michelle Morgan, another writer and author of biography Madonna (2015), said that "seeing her vast list of accomplishments has given me great encouragement to go after my own dreams of becoming a full-time writer", and "within my desire to become a writer was the dream to do a book about Madonna".

Photographer Mario Testino is another example among personalities outside the music industry. In an interview with Nigel Farndale he commented Madonna is the first non-model in collaborating with him and credited: "With her I knew I had discovered my style because I like to believe what I am photographing". Fashion designer Anna Sui cited Madonna as an influence in her career. She commented that an encounter with the singer gave her "confidence" and "boosted" the idea to start her first own runway show.

Her influence has been also found in contemporary artists. A general example include a 2014 article from Dazed by curator Jefferson Hack when she was "interpreted by contemporary artists" with portraits in art forms and their feelings about her. One of them was Silvia Prada whose said: "For me, Madonna has became even more important than any art movement in terms of history and popular culture". Scottish painter Peter Howson whose dedicated numerous pieces to the singer once commented that "she's a subject everyone is drawn to". Mexican painter Alberto Gironella dedicated almost all his works in his latest days to Madonna and he described that "more than pop [she] is the last surrealist".

"Madonna" as a nickname or title for others

Contradictory perspective 

Madonna has been rejected in all forms that was lauded, and the disagreement persists in equal parts. In the mid-2010s, it was suggested that "perhaps no one has sparked more debate than she has" among all cultural icons of the last three decades. In 2019, Matthew Jacobs, editor of HuffPost called her "world's most accomplished pop star" but opined that "it's hard to thing" of any star with "as many singular achievements and such a durable place in Western media who provokes so much ire an indifference". Mary Cross noted that she has been perceived as a "corrupting influence". In this way, some "critics willingly overlook Madonna's impact on contemporary culture". As for some observers, in Madonna the zeitgeist has become poltergeist. Educator John R. Silber lumped Madonna with Adolf Hitler and Saddam Hussein.

As a complex figure she has been, critical theorist, Stuart Sim found that she "attained the status of cultural icon, she is however, an extremely problematic one" concluding that "makes her exceedingly difficult to categorize; depending on one's point of view". In this vein, associate professor Diane Pecknold that Madonna "was not only an omnipresent figure but a polarizing one". From a common view, American essayist Nancy Gibbs wrote that "Madonna is so easy to revile that you start to wish she'd make it a little harder".

During her career, Madonna attracted the attention of family organizations, feminist anti-porn and religious groups worldwide with boycott or protests. Associate professor Steven C. Dubin, noticed that she "has the distinction of enraging a variety of religious leaders". For authors like Jock McGregor of Christian organization L'Abri "the sector of society most offended by Madonna, has been Christian community". Bishop Patric Dunn described that "some of Madonna's material is highly offensive to Christianity". Mark D. Hulsether cited in Religion and Popular Culture in America by Bruce Forbes, expressed that "some of the most important and interesting texts in recent American culture which have overlapping concerns with liberation theologies are by Madonna".

As some critics found that Madonna has proved a master of cultural appropriation, professor of sociology and author David Chaney documented in his book The Cultural Turn (1994) that "for many political activists, the more unsettling implication is that Madonna has destabilised fundamental signs of subcultural membership. Even if her stardom is now exhausted". He further asserted that "the possibility of her existence" (as with other figures) is that "all marks of identity are arbitrary, then any form of being becomes pastiche". Sociologist John Shepherd wrote that Madonna's cultural practices highlight the "sadly continuing social realities of dominance and subordination". As she used symbols and images from other cultures and sub-cultures, various agents criticized her for "utilizing its images and style in her work, defused of its original context".

During the first decades of her career, Madonna was criticized about consumerism and materialism. Viewed in this context, Madonna's texts raise many critiques on the modalities of commercial success and desire. The implication of this is that beneath the musical surfaces there lurks an ambition and passion that is quite insatiable. Many of these reviewers used the analogy of her song "Material Girl", like professor Gail Dines whom classified Madonna to embodied the materialistic and consumer-oriented ethos of the 1980s. Glenn Ward wrote in his book Discover Postmodernism: Flash (2011) that "for some critics the Madonna phenomenon represents the worst excesses of commercial exploitation". An author called her as the "supreme product of the consumerist culture". For Douglas Kellner, she is the "epitome of banal consumerism". Overall, for her detractors she became the "ultimate in crass" commercialism and media manipulation. For American author Michelle Goldberg, the "notion of celebrity as an art form that Madonna helped propagate has hideous consequences". Also, authors of Madonnarama (1993), noticed that "when it comes to talking about Madonna, suddenly everybody is a critic of capitalism".

When she entered in her fifties, others commentators viewed her as turned "inauthentic" media manipulator, whose acts deemed "desperate" and "embarrassing", as professor Jeetendr Sehdev advises in his academic research dedicated to the singer: "Madonna's desperate attempts to attention have damaged her legacy". In Madonna: Like an Icon, author Lucy O'Brien wrote that the popular negative stereotype is that of a publicity-hungry or manipulative ballbreaker.

Vince Aletti commented that "she has been attacked by critics for being more about image than substance". American essayist Barbara Grizzuti Harrison commented the issues in Madonna's usage of images, as she states that "in her works the line between person and image has become hopelessly blurred, as has the line between responsibility and manipulation". She objected that as long as Madonna wears masks —and confuses the person with the image— there is no real person there.

American psychiatrist Aviel Goodman advised in the early-1990s that her re-inventions are "of particular concern for some feminist who view her multiple personae as a threat to women's socialization, which entails the necessary integration of female identity". Another concern, was explained by authors in Representing gender in cultures (2004), as they commented that "it is the very instability of Madonna's image, its incessant reinvention that produces anxiety both in the mass audience and the academic circle, and encourages frequent and rather desperate attempts at finding a steady poin". Kellner, stressed that she "problematized identity and revealed its constructedness and alterability".

Some observers argued that "Madonna has been consistently denied a status of a 'real' musician". Author Keith E. Clifton wrote that "in the field of musicology, serious discussion of Madonna has been even rarer than in the popular press". Christgau said, in short "Madonna is honored less as an artist than as a cultural force". Ludovic Hunter-Tilney from Financial Times noted that to her critics she "is right to describe herself as a businesswoman but wrong to call herself an artist". In a broader concern, Micheel Golden said that due to Madonna's influence, "artistic output has become a by-product of fame instead of the reason for it".

Writer Michael Campbell felt that "neither [Michael] Jackson nor Madonna has been a musical innovator", although explained that "their most influential and innovative contributions have come in other areas". In another ambivalent point, Australian public intellectual Germaine Greer admitted she is of the opinion shared by many that "she can neither dance nor sing" but described that "Madonna has the one talent that really matters in the 21st century" which is "marketing".

Cultural criticisms around the world 
Researchers at the University of Liverpool labelled the "Madonna effect" to the international adoptions and social issues followed by her first process in 2006. At that time, the child psychologist Kevin Browne found that closely related with the Madonna-style process, there were a rise in the number of children in orphanages across Europe due the trend of international adoptions. They also perceived that some parents in poor countries were giving up their children "in the belief that they will have a 'better life in the west' with a more wealthy family". When she planned to adopt again in 2017, some activists warned that Madonna's act "would facilitate the child trafficking in Africa". As an Italian American figure, Italian sculptor Walter Pugni planned in 1988 a statue of Madonna in Pacentro, where are from her paternal grandparents, noting that "Madonna is a symbol of our children and represents a better world in the year 2000". The then mayor of the comune opposed to that idea as well Madonna's Italian relatives.

Counter-responses 

Lecturer John Street from University of East Anglia wrote in his article Musicologists, Sociologists and Madonna (1993), that as she has been criticized, has been as well "defended in equally extravagant terms". British reader Deborah Jermyn of Roehampton University wrote in 2016, that "numerous academic studies have considered the way Madonna polarises views". To New Zealand professor Roy Shuker, the discourse surrounding the singer "provides a range of contradictory readings and evaluations". Similar to Shuker, professor Robert C. Allen summarized that she is "the site of whole series of discourses, many of which contradict each other but which together produce the divergent images of circulation".

While her criticism have generated significant analysis and counter-responses, associate professor Gayle Stever for Empire State College states in The Psychology of Celebrity (2018), that "the attention Madonna received from being controversial opened up an entire new way of thinking". In particular, Maria Gallagher wrote for The Philadelphia Inquirer in 1992, that "there is no avoiding Madonna, so we might as well study her". She found sociologist Cindy Patton described that "[Madonna is] a social critic in a certain way" and "has an instinct for not just what's going to get people upset, but what's going to get people thinking".

Scholar Gaugler advocated for the singer expressing that "she has faced much criticism throughout her career, but much of it is unjust". In the perception of marketer and professor Stephen Brown from University of Ulster "what people say about Madonna says more about them than it says about the singer". Similarly, Frenchman Georges-Claude Guilbert expressed: "Some journalist enjoy being particularly venomous when writing about Madonna, revealing more about themselves than anything else". Stan Hawkins from University of Leeds expressed in the late-1990s that "Madonna's act[s] can only infuriate those who are unfamiliar with the everyday forms of human expression visible in commercials, films, videos, fashion, literature, art and journalism".

American music critic Dave Marsh noticed she faced critics related to sexism. In a further review on this point, Canadian professor Karlene Faith said that "just as Madonna offends conformists, so does she offend those opposing sexism, ageism, racism, classism, and so on". For author Gene N. Landrum, "if nothing else, she is honest in her perversity" explaining that "she may be offensive to the Church and appear sacrilegious to most people, but she is more honest than many women seen walking the streets of the world with crucifixes dangling precariously and blatantly between amply exposed cleavage". According to E. Ann Kaplan "the anti-Madonna media discourse serves those threatened by her challenges to patriarchal heterosexual norms". For Kellner, "Madonna takes on demonstrates a courage to tackle controversial topics that few popular music figures engage with her consistency and provocativeness".

In this vein, Jesse Nash, a Loyola University history professor, views that the scandal she creates, "proves that Westerners till uphold values that subjugate women". By expressing and exposing herself, is a notion of self-ownership, said professor. Madonna was quoted saying: "I own myself, I will not be anyone's property". Nash compared this to Cleopatra, adding that "the Romans would have understood this immediately and locked her up. The Greeks would have been intrigued".

Musicologist Susan McClary suggests that Madonna is engaged in rewriting some very fundamental levels of Western thought. Another consideration came from Canadian scholar Samantha C. Thrift of Simon Fraser University whose said "the body of criticism inspired by Madonna's cultural production opened avenues for feminist analysis" for other figures such as Martha Stewart. Dutch academics in the article Madonna as a symbol of reflexive modernisation (2013) viewed her as a "symbol" and "representation" and propose that "the communication of social and cultural tensions embodied in Madonna, explain the unparalleled public and scientific fascination for this cultural phenomenon". In a 2005 international congress, Catalan translator and assistant professor Lydia Brugué of Universitat de Vic gives her sympathetic view:

The statement of Norman Mailer when he "defended" Madonna calling her as "our greatest living female artist" has been also cited by some of her defenders. In her article You Don't Know Madonna (2002) American novelist Jennifer Egan questioned commentaries from others critics such those arguing that "Madonna has no real talent". While she confessed was part of that general perception retrospectively viewed them as an "old one". She also found sense remarking that "music per se has never encompassed the full range of Madonna's aspirations" when she once commented to the media: "I know I'm not the best singer, and I know I'm not the best dancer. But I'm not interested in that" but in being "political". Music critic Jon Pareles explained that she "labeled herself more efficiently than any observer" since the beginning of her career. Similarly, authors of academic compendium The Madonna Connection (1993) commented that "as usual, Madonna is at least one step ahead of her commentators".

Honorific nicknames and epithets for Madonna 

Madonna has been called many things. The A.V. Club editors Alex McLevy and Kelsey J. Waite noted that superlatives in her career are given. British reader Deborah Jermyn of Roehampton University wrote in her book Female Celebrity and Ageing (2016) that  "Madonna has been frequently described as a 'queen'... Queen of Pop, Disco, the Century or Reinvention". In regards her titles, honorific nicknames and epithets, Chilean magazine Qué Pasa stated in 1996 that "to Madonna can be attributed many titles and never be exaggerated. She is the undisputed Queen of Pop, sex goddess, and of course marketing". Australian professor Robert Clarke of University of Tasmania wrote in Celebrity Colonialism (2009) that Madonna is identified with a "range of nicknames such as 'The Material Girl' or 'The Queen of Pop' referring to her big business pop career".

Scottish music blogger Alan McGee asserted that Madonna and Michael Jackson invented the terms "Queen and King of Pop", while American journalist Edna Gundersen described Michael Jackson, Prince and Madonna as a "durable pop triumvirate" during their half-centenary in 2009. Professors in Ageing, Popular Culture and Contemporary Feminism (2014) argued that "her status as a cultural icon is acknowledged in all press accounts" and her reign as Queen of Pop is "reverentially upheld by her reviewers". Time to time, she received the tag of "Goddess of Pop" by major newspapers like Los Angeles Times and La Nación. Also, she was also slightly called "Queen of Rock" in her early career.

In a cultural perspective, for critics like Vince Aletti she is a "modern muse", and for some sociologists such as Polish professor Zbyszko Melosik, she is an "intertextual heroine". Academics Andrew Sayer and Larry Ray found that "she has been widely proclaimed as a postmodern heroine". American philosopher Susan Bordo disagrees, as for her, the singer may be a "postmodern heroine" but not necessarily an "admirable one". American journalist Peter Travers called her as "our Postmodern Goddess". In less favorable views, during the academic fields of the late 20th century, Madonna was called by some the "queen of gender disorder" and "racial deconstruction". She was also named "Queen of appropriation".

American critic Kristine McKenna deemed her goddess of mass communications. A similar tag received from Jon Pareles who called her the "queen of multimedia promotion". Professor Mathew Donahue of Bowling Green State University called her "Queen of all Media". She had an impact on MTV, and was referred to as the Queen of MTV, with CNN staff commenting that MTV could stand for "Madonna Television". British press dubbed her "Madge" when she moved to London in the late-1990s. One of the meanings of this word is shorthand for Your Majesty. According to the Indian Council of Medical Research, she is "often lauded as the Queen of Creativity".

Australian magazine The Music summarized that "Madonna is many things", noting that as "she is the Queen of Pop", a "revolutionary", "feminist boss" or "serial reinventor", for some Madonna is a "problematic fave", "culture vulture", "a controversialist" and "has been successively cancelled". Simon Gage in Queer: The Ultimate User's Guide (2002) also pointed out that she has been described as a "man-eater, manipulator, monster, bitch [or] whore".

Critics' lists and polls 
Biographer Mark Bego commented she attained a very "high-profile" adding that "when it came time for magazines to announce the biggest, best, and most defining events and creative products of the century (xx), Madonna was right there". As she appeared in various listicles during her career, associate professor Diane Pecknold shared her observation in American Icons (2006) saying that "nearly any poll of the biggest, greatest, or best in popular culture includes her name". A similar argument was provided by The Daily Telegraph editor William Langley whose documented in 2011 that she has been a fixture of several "list of world's most powerful/admired/influential women". According to Acclaimed Music, which statistically aggregates hundreds of critics' lists, Madonna is the most acclaimed woman in music history. Some illustrative examples include:

Cultural depictions 
Nota bene: This section only includes illustrative examples

Madonna's life and career have been depicted in film, television, literature, music, arts, and even science. In a general sense, academic Guilbert found that she "is the ultimate reference in several domains" and her "likeness" has been exhibited in museums.

In 2006, a new water bear species, Echiniscus madonnae, was named after her. The paper with the description of E. madonnae was published in the international journal of animal taxonomy Zootaxa in March 2006 (Vol. 1154, pp. 1–36). The Zoologists commented: "We take great pleasure in dedicating this species to one of the most significant artists of our times, Madonna Louise Veronica Ritchie". Quadricona madonnae is a fossil Bradoriid from the Cambrian of South Australia, "named for the American entertainer Madonna; in reference to the nodes on each valve resembling her conical brassiere made famous during the 1980s and 1990s, particularly her "Blond Ambition" tour in 1990".

Madonna has been a subject of music collectors and was classified at number one in the 100 Most Collectable Divas by Record Collector in 2008. Her songs have been covered by numerous performers in multiple languages and various artists have released tribute albums. She also inspired the creation of new musical singles. In 2002, Australian rock band The Androids scored a top-five hit single on the ARIA Chart with "Do It with Madonna". English singer Robbie Williams released "She's Madonna" in 2006, which reached the top five in many European countries. The song talks about his fascination with Madonna, and is a reference to Guy Ritchie who left his ex-girlfriend Tania Strecker for Madonna. In 2010, South Korean girl group Secret reached number one on the Gaon Singles Chart with the song "Madonna" from the EP of the same name. According to its songwriters, the song is about "living with confidence by becoming an icon in this generation, like the American star Madonna".

Numerous international contemporary and visual artists have been inspired to depict Madonna. A book called Madonna In Art (2004) compiled pictures of the singer in art form by over 116 artists from 23 countries, including Andrew Logan, Sebastian Krüger, Al Hirschfeld, and Peter Howson. Her figure has been part of various art contemporary exhibitions, like De Madonna a Madonna (in English: From Madonna to Madonna) installed in countries such as Chile (Centro Cultural Matucana 100), Spain (MUSAC) and Argentina (Juan B. Castagnino Fine Arts Museum) to approach the role of women throughout history. Madonna is also represented in the National Portrait Gallery, London by five photographs, two by Eric Watson, two by Mario Testino and one by Dafydd Jones.

See also 
 Madonna studies: Madonna's impact on academia
 Madonna wannabe: Madonna's impact on fashion and identity
 Madonna as a gay icon: Madonna's impact on the LGBT community

Notes

References

Book sources

External links 
 

Madonna
Cultural depictions of Madonna
Madonna